= List of third-party Sony E-mount lenses =

Various third-party lens manufacturers have released the following lenses for Sony E-mount cameras since 2010. They are also compatible with Hasselblad E-mount cameras.

== Autofocus, electronic aperture ==
=== APS-C lenses ===
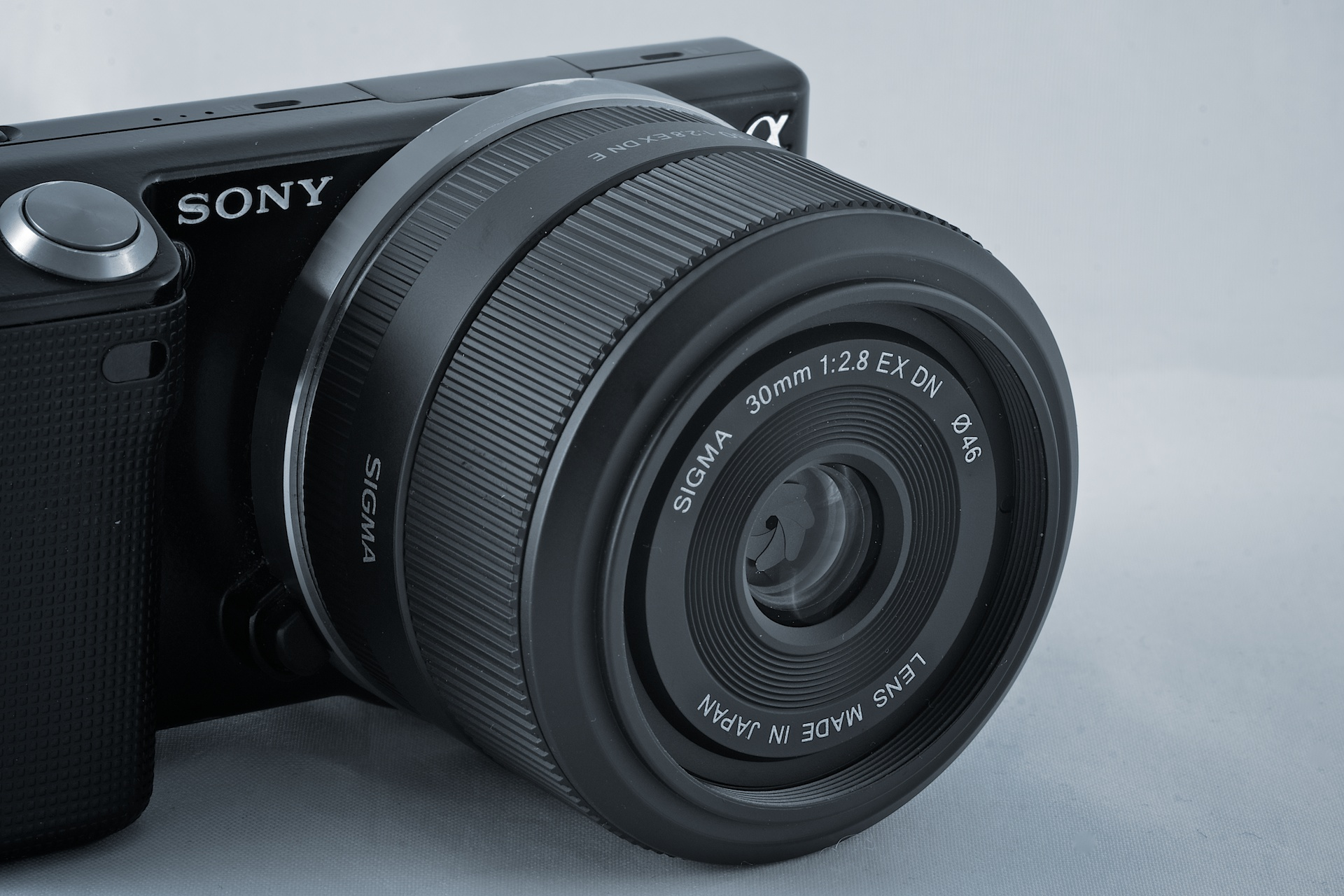
Sony NEX-5 with Sigma 30mm F2.8 EX DN lens.

==== Prime lenses ====
Brand	Model	Intro.	Foc. Len.	Aperture		Wgt	Filter Size	⌀	L	Min. Foc.	Mag.	Notes
Brand	Model	Intro.	Foc. Len.	Max	Min	Wgt	Filter Size	⌀	L	Min. Foc.	Mag.	Notes
7Artisans	AF 18mm F2	2026-09	18mm	f/2	f/16	109g	52mm	64mm	32mm	0.2m	?	
Meike	58mm f1.2 MIX	2026-11	58mm	f/1.2	f/16	450g	62mm	76mm	90mm	0.62m	?	
Samyang / Rokinon	AF 12mm F2 E	2021-04	12mm	f/2	f/22	213g	62mm	70.0mm	59.2mm	0.19m	1:11	
Sigma	12mm F1.4 DC | Contemporary	2025-08	12mm	f/1.4	f/16	225g	62mm	68.0mm	69.4mm	0.172m	1:8.4	
Sigma	15mm F1.4 DC DN | Contemporary	2026-02	15mm	f/1.4	f/16	220g	58mm	64.0mm	64.8mm	0.177m	1:7.9	
Sigma	16mm F1.4 DC DN | Contemporary	2017	16mm	f/1.4	f/16	405g	67mm	72.2mm	92.3mm	0.25m	1:9.9	
Sigma	19mm F2.8 EX DN	2012	19mm	f/2.8	f/22	140g	46mm	60.6mm	45.7mm	0.20m	1:7.4	discontinued
Sigma	19mm F2.8 DN | Art	2013-01	19mm	f/2.8	f/22	160g	46mm	60.8mm	45.7mm	0.20m	1:7.4	new edition
Sigma	23mm F1.4 DC DN | Contemporary	2023-04	23mm	f/1.4	f/16	330g	52mm	65.8mm	78.9mm	0.25m	1:7.3	
Sigma	30mm F2.8 EX DN	2012	30mm	f/2.8	f/22	130g	46mm	60.6mm	38.6mm	0.30m	1:8.1	discontinued
Sigma	30mm F2.8 DN | Art	2013-01	30mm	f/2.8	f/22	140g	46mm	60.8mm	40.5mm	0.30m	1:8.1	new edition
Sigma	30mm F1.4 DC DN | Contemporary	2016-02	30mm	f/1.4	f/16	265g	52mm	64.8mm	73.3mm	0.30m	1:7	
Sigma	56mm F1.4 DC DN | Contemporary	2018-09	56mm	f/1.4	f/16	280g	55mm	66.5mm	59.5mm	0.50m	1:7.4	
Sigma	60mm F2.8 DN | Art	2013-01	60mm	f/2.8	f/22	190g	46mm	60.8mm	55.5mm	0.50m	1:7.2	discontinued 2019
Sirui	16mm F1.2	2024-06	16mm	f/1.2	f/16	384g	58mm	?	94mm	0.3m	?	
Sirui	20mm T1.8 1.33x Anamorphic	2025-03	20mm	T1.8	T22	489.3g	77mm	86.4mm	90.95mm	0.4m	X:1:15; Y:1:20	
Sirui	23mm F1.2	2023-11	23mm	f/1.2	f/16	381g	58mm	?	92.5mm	0.3m	?	
Sirui	33mm F1.2	2023-11	33mm	f/1.2	f/16	400g	58mm	?	92.5mm	0.4m	?	
Sirui	40mm T1.8 1.33× Anamorphic	2024-12	40mm	T1.8	T22	633g	77mm	86.4mm	128.2mm	0.6m	X:1:19; Y:1:14.2	
Sirui	56mm F1.2	2023-11	56mm	f/1.2	f/16	422g	58mm	?	92.5mm	0.6m	?	
Sirui	75mm F1.2	2024-06	75mm	f/1.2	f/16	466g	67mm	?	94mm	0.7m	?	
Tokina	atx-m 23mm F1.4 E	2021-10	23mm	f/1.4	f/16	276g	52mm	65mm	72mm	0.3m	1:10	
Tokina	atx-m 33mm F1.4 E	2021-10	33mm	f/1.4	f/16	285g	52mm	65mm	72mm	0.4m	1:10	
Tokina	atx-m 56mm F1.4 E	2021-10	56mm	f/1.4	f/16	315g	52mm	65mm	72mm	0.6m	1:10	
TTArtisan	AF 17mm f1.8 Air	2026-04	17mm	f/1.8	f/16	161~; 178g	52mm	60mm	47mm	0.18m		
TTArtisan	AF 27mm F2.8	2023-04	27mm	f/2.8	f/16	88g	39mm	61mm	29mm	0.35m	~1:10-11	
TTArtisan	AF 35mm F1.8	2023-10	35mm	f/1.8	f/16	199g	52mm	65mm	60mm	0.35m	?	
TTArtisan	AF 56mm F1.8	2023-12	56mm	f/1.8	f/16	233g	52mm	65mm	62mm	0.5m	?	
Viltrox	AF 9mm F2.8 Air	2025-09	9mm	f/2.8	f/16	175g	58mm	65mm	56.4mm	0.13m	1:6.7	
Viltrox	AF 13mm F1.4	2022-07	13mm	f/1.4	f/16	420g	67mm	74mm	90mm	0.22m	1:10	
Viltrox	AF 15mm F1.7 Air	2025-07	15mm	f/1.7	f/16	180g	58mm	65mm	56.4mm	0.23m	1:10	
Viltrox	AF 23mm F1.4	2019-08	23mm	f/1.4	f/16	260g	52mm	65mm	72mm	0.3m	1:10	
Viltrox	AF 25mm F1.7 Air	2025-02	25mm	f/1.7	f/16	170g	52mm	64mm	56.4mm	0.3m	1:9.1	
Viltrox	AF 27mm F1.2 Pro	2024-02	27mm	f/1.2	f/16	565g	67mm	82mm	92mm	0.28m	1:6.7	
Viltrox	AF 33mm F1.4	2019-08	33mm	f/1.4	f/16	270g	52mm	65mm	72mm	0.4m	1:10	
Viltrox	AF 35mm F1.7 Air	2024-12	35mm	f/1.7	f/16	170g	52mm	64mm	56.4mm	0.33m	1:7.7	
Viltrox	AF 56mm F1.2 Pro	2025-09	56mm	f/1.2	f/16	570g	67mm	78.4mm	91.7mm	0.5m	1:7.7	
Viltrox	AF 56mm F1.4	2019-08	56mm	f/1.4	f/16	290g	52mm	65mm	72mm	0.6m	1:10	
Viltrox	AF 56mm F1.7 Air	2024-08	56mm	f/1.7	f/16	170g	52mm	65mm	54.3mm	0.55m	1:9.1	
Viltrox	AF 75mm F1.2 Pro	2023-07	75mm	f/1.2	f/16	675g	77mm	87mm	101mm	0.88m	1:10	
Viltrox	AF 75mm F1.8 EVO	2026-06	75mm	f/1.8	f/16	335g	58mm	69mm	76mm	0.74m	1:8.3	
Viltrox	AF 90mm F2.2 EVO	2026-06	90mm	f/2.2	f/16	320g	58mm	69mm	76mm	0.74m	1:7.1	
Yongnuo	YN11mm F1.8S DA DSM WL	2024-01	11mm	f/1.8	f/16	260g	58mm	66mm	69mm	0.15m	1:6.7	
Yongnuo	YN16mm F1.8S DA DSM	2022	16mm	f/1.8	f/16	274g	58mm	64mm	69mm	0.17m	1:6.7	
Yongnuo	YN50mm F1.8S DA DSM	2020	50mm	f/1.8	f/16	146g	49mm	64mm	58mm	0.45m	1:7.1	
Zeiss	Touit 2.8/12	2012-09 for mid-2013	12mm	f/2.8	f/22	260g	67mm	88mm	68mm	0.18m	1:9	
Zeiss	Touit 1.8/32	2012-09 for mid-2013	32mm	f/1.8	f/22	200g	52mm	75mm	60mm	0.30m	1:9	
Zeiss	Touit 2.8/50M	2012-09 for spring 2014-02	50mm	f/2.8	f/22	290g	52mm	75mm	91mm	0.15m	1:1	

==== Zoom lenses ====
Brand	Ref.	Model	Intro.	Focal Length		Aperture				Opt. Stab.	Wgt	Filter Size	⌀	Len.	Min Focus		Magnification	
Brand	Ref.	Model	Intro.	Focal Length		Wide Angle		Telephoto		Opt. Stab.	Wgt	Filter Size	⌀	Len.	Min Focus		Magnification	
Brand	Ref.	Model	Intro.	Min	Max	Max	Min	Max	Min	Opt. Stab.	Wgt	Filter Size	⌀	Len.	Wide Angle	Telephoto	Wide Angle	Telephoto
Sigma	C023	10-18mm F2.8 DC DN | Contemporary	2023-10	10mm	18mm	f/2.8	f/22	f/2.8	f/22	No	255g	67mm	72.2mm	64.0mm	0.116m	0.191m	1:4	1:6.9
Sigma	C025	16-300mm F3.5-6.7 DC OS | Contemporary	2025-02	16mm	300mm	f/3.5	f/22	f/6.7	f/45	Yes	615g	67mm	73.8mm	123.4mm	0.17m	1.05m	1:2 at 70mm	
Sigma	A025	17-40mm F1.8 DC | Art	2025-06	17mm	40mm	f/1.8	f/16	f/1.8	f/16	No	525g	67mm	72.9mm	117.9mm	0.28m		?	1:4.8
Sigma	C021	18-50mm F2.8 DC DN | Contemporary	2021-10	18mm	50mm	f/2.8	f/22	f/2.8	f/22	No	290g	55mm	61.6mm	76.5mm	0.121m	0.30m	1:2.8	1:5
Sigma	C026	50-120mm F2.8 DC OS | Contemporary	2026-10	50mm	120mm	f/2.8	f/22	f/2.8	f/22	Yes	390g	55mm	66.8mm	99.0mm	0.23m	0.55m	1:3	1:4.7
Tamron	B060	11-20mm F/2.8 Di III-A RXD	2021-04	11mm	20mm	f/2.8	f/16	f/2.8	f/16	No	335g	67mm	73mm	86.2mm	0.15m	0.24m	1:4	1:7.6
Tamron	B091	16-50mm F2.8 A	2026-10	16mm	50mm	f/2.8	f/16	f/2.8	f/16	No	305g	55mm	64.4mm	79.6mm	0.15m	0.29m	1:4.5	1:4.8
Tamron	B070	17-70mm F/2.8 Di III-A VC RXD	2020-12	17mm	70mm	f/2.8	f/22	f/2.8	f/22	Yes	525g	67mm	74.6mm	119.3mm	0.19m	0.39m	1:4.8	1:5.2
Tamron	B011	18-200mm F/3.5-6.3 Di III VC	2011-12	18mm	200mm	f/3.5	f/22	f/6.3	f/40	Yes	460g	62mm	68mm	96.7mm	0.50m		1:3.7	
Tamron	B061	18-300mm F/3.5-6.3 Di III-A VC VXD	2021-07	18mm	300mm	f/3.5	f/22	f/6.3	f/40	Yes	620g	67mm	75.5mm	125.6mm	0.15m	0.99m	1:2	1:4
Tokina		atx-m 11-18mm F2.8 E	2022-08	11mm	18mm	f/2.8	f/22	f/2.8	f/22	No	335g	67mm	74.4mm	74.1mm	0.19m	0.3m	1:9.2	1:12.4

=== Full-frame lenses ===
==== Prime lenses ====
Brand	Ref.	Model	Intro.	Foc. Len.	Aperture		Opt. Stab.	Wgt	Filter Size	⌀	L	Min. Foc.	Mag.	Notes
Brand	Ref.	Model	Intro.	Foc. Len.	Max	Min	Opt. Stab.	Wgt	Filter Size	⌀	L	Min. Foc.	Mag.	Notes
7Artisans		AF 10mm F2.5	2026-08	10mm	f/2.5	f/16	No	504g	—N/a	76mm	94mm	0.15m	?	Fisheye
7Artisans		AF 40mm F2.5	2026-08	40mm	f/2.5	f/16	No	90g	46mm	63mm	40mm	0.4m	?	
7Artisans		AF 50mm F1.8	2024-03	50mm	f/1.8	f/16	No	421g	62mm	72mm	104mm	0.5m	?	
7Artisans		AF 135mm F1.8	2026-07	135mm	f/1.8	f/16	No	1014g	82mm	91.2mm	130mm	0.68m	1:4.0	
AstrHori		85mm F1.8 AF	2022-12	85mm	f/1.8	f/16	No	626g	72mm	80mm	93.5mm	0.79m	?	
LAOWA		10mm f/2.8 Zero-D FF	2024-01	10mm	f/2.8	f/22	No	420g	77mm	82mm	72.8mm	0.12m	1:4.2	
LAOWA		12mm f/2.8 Lite Zero-D FF	2025-06	12mm	f/2.8	f/22	No	377g	72mm	77mm	76.5mm	0.14m	1:4.8	
LAOWA		ACRIS 35mm f/2.8 1X Macro APO	2026-09	35mm	f/2.8	f/22	No	560g	72mm	87.4mm	79mm	0.5m (AF); 0.180m (MF)	1:1	
LAOWA		180mm f/4.5 1.5X Ultra Macro APO	2025-09	180mm	f/4.5	f/22 AF f/32 MF	No	521.6g	62mm	67.6mm	134.4mm	0.300m	1.5:1	
LAOWA		200mm f/2 AF FF	2025-10	200mm	f/2	f/22	No	1588g	105mm (front); 43mm (rear)	118mm	174.8mm	1.5m	1:6.7	
Meike		85mm F1.4 AF	2023-11	85mm	f/1.4	f/16	No	735g	77mm	87mm	114mm	0.98m	?	
Meike		85mm f1.8 Pro FF AF STM	2024-11	85mm	f/1.8	f/16	No	389g	62mm	76mm	95mm	0.85m	1:9.1	
Meike		85mm F1.8 SE Mark II	2025-11	85mm	f/1.8	f/16	No	369g	62mm	76mm	100.2mm	0.65m	?	
Meike		85mm F1.8 FF STM	2022-06	85mm	f/1.8	f/22	No	386g	67mm	79.5mm	?	0.9m	?	
Samyang		AF 14mm F2.8 FE	2016-08	14mm	f/2.8	f/22	No	500g	—N/a	86mm	97.5mm	0.20m	1:8.3	
Samyang		AF 16mm F2.8 P FE	2025-07	16mm	f/2.8	f/22	No	207g	62mm	69.8mm	70.5mm	0.12m	1:3.0	
Samyang		AF 18mm F2.8 FE	2019-08	18mm	f/2.8	f/22	No	145g	58mm	63.5mm	60.5mm	0.25m	1:11	
Samyang		V-AF 20mm T1.9 FE	2024-05	20mm	T1.9	f/22?	No	300g	rear gelatin	72.2mm	76.9mm	0.20m	?	Cine autofocus, all V-AF lenses are same size and weight
Samyang		AF 24mm F1.8 FE	2021-04	24mm	f/1.8	f/22	No	230g	58mm	65mm	71.5mm	0.19m	1:4.7	
Samyang		V-AF 24mm T1.9 FE	2022-11	24mm	T1.9	f/22	No	280g	58mm	72.2mm	72.1mm	0.19m	1:4.7?	Cine autofocus, all V-AF lenses are same size and weight
Samyang		AF 24mm F2.8 FE	2018-06	24mm	f/2.8	f/22	No	120g	49mm	61.8mm	37.0mm	0.24m	1:7.7	
Samyang		AF 35mm F1.4 FE	2017-10	35mm	f/1.4	f/16	No	645g	67mm	75.9mm	115mm	0.30m	1:5.9	
Samyang		AF 35mm F1.4 FE II	2022-03	35mm	f/1.4	f/16	No	659g	67mm	75.0mm	115.0mm	0.29m	1:5.6	
Samyang		AF 35mm F1.4 P FE	2024-12	35mm	f/1.4	f/16	No	470g	67mm	75.0mm	99.2mm	0.30m	1:6	
Samyang		AF 35mm F1.8 FE	2020-09	35mm	f/1.8	f/22	No	210g	58mm	65.0mm	63.5mm	0.29m	1:5.9	
Samyang		AF 35mm F1.8 P FE	2026-03	35mm	f/1.8	f/22	No	216g	62mm	69.8mm	71.5mm	0.27m	1:5.3	
Samyang		V-AF 35mm T1.9 FE	2022-11	35mm	T1.9	f/22	No	280g	58mm	72.2mm	72.1mm	0.29m	1:5.9?	Cine autofocus, all V-AF lenses are same size and weight
Samyang		AF 35mm F2.8 FE	2017-06	35mm	f/2.8	f/22	No	108.1g	49mm /40.5mm	61.8mm	33mm	0.35m	1:8.3	
Samyang		AF 45mm F1.8 FE	2019-05	45mm	f/1.8	f/22	No	162g	49mm	61.8mm	56.1mm	0.45m	1:8.3	
Samyang		V-AF 45mm T1.9 FE	2023-05	45mm	T1.9	f/22?	No	280g	58mm	72.2mm	72.1mm	0.38m	1:8.3?	Cine autofocus, all V-AF lenses are same size and weight
Samyang		AF 50mm F1.4 FE	2016-05	50mm	f/1.4	f/16	No	585g	67mm	73.5mm	97.7mm	0.45m	1:6.7	
Samyang		AF 50mm F1.4 FE II	2021-11	50mm	f/1.4	f/16	No	420g	72mm	80.1mm	88.9mm	0.40m	1:6.3	
Samyang		AF 75mm F1.8 FE	2020-04	75mm	f/1.8	f/22	No	230g	58mm	65.0mm	69.0mm	0.69m	1:7.7	
Samyang		V-AF 75mm T1.9 FE	2022-09	75mm	T1.9	f/22?	No	280g	58mm	72.2mm	72.1mm	0.69m	1:7.7	Cine autofocus, all V-AF lenses are same size and weight
Samyang		AF 85mm F1.4 FE	2019-03	85mm	f/1.4	f/16	No	568g	77mm	88.0mm	99.5mm	0.90m	1:9.1	
Samyang		AF 85mm F1.4 FE II	2022-07	85mm	f/1.4	f/16	No	509g	72mm	83.4mm	99.5mm	0.85m	1:8.3	
Samyang		AF 85mm F1.8 P FE	2025-07	85mm	f/1.8	f/22	No	272g	62mm	69.8mm	71.5mm	0.8m	1:8.3	
Samyang		V-AF 100mm T2.3	2024-01	100mm	T2.3	?	No	280g	58mm	72.2mm	85.3mm	0.70m		
Samyang		AF 135mm F1.8 FE	2022-01	135mm	f/1.8	f/22	No	772g	82mm	93.4mm	129.6mm	0.69m	1:4.1	
Sigma	A023	14mm F1.4 DG DN | Art	2023-06	14mm	f/1.4	f/16	No	1160g	—N/a	101.4mm	151.9mm	0.30m	1:11.9	
Sigma	A017	14mm F1.8 DG HSM | Art	2017-02	14mm	f/1.8	f/16	No	1170g	—N/a	95.4mm	152mm	0.27m	1:9.8	
Sigma	A024	15mm F1.4 DG DN DIAGONAL FISHEYE | Art	2024-02	15mm	f/1.4	f/16	No	1360g	—N/a	104mm	159.9mm	0.385m	1:16	
Sigma	C023	17mm F4 DG DN | Contemporary (I series)	2023-04	17mm	f/4	f/22	No	220g	55mm	64.0mm	50.8mm	0.12m	1:3.6	
Sigma	A022	20mm F1.4 DG DN | Art	2022-08	20mm	f/1.4	f/16	No	630g	82mm	87.8mm	113.2mm	0.23m	1:6.1	
Sigma	A015	20mm F1.4 DG HSM | Art	2018-02	20mm	f/1.4	f/16	No	1015g	—N/a	90.7mm	155.8mm	0.276m	1:7.1	
Sigma	C022	20mm F2 DG DN | Contemporary (I series)	2022-02	20mm	f/2	f/22	No	370g	62mm	70mm	74.4mm	0.22m	1:6.7	
Sigma	A022	24mm F1.4 DG DN | Art	2022-08	24mm	f/1.4	f/16	No	510g	72mm	75.7mm	97.5mm	0.25m	1:7.1	
Sigma	A015	24mm F1.4 DG HSM | Art	2018-02	24mm	f/1.4	f/16	No	740g	77mm	85.4mm	116.2mm	0.25m	1:5.3	
Sigma	C021	24mm F2 DG DN | Contemporary (I series)	2021-09	24mm	f/2	f/22	No	360g	62mm	70mm	74mm	0.245m	1:6.7	
Sigma	C021	24mm F3.5 DG DN | Contemporary (I series)	2020-12	24mm	f/3.5	f/22	No	230g	55mm	64mm	50.8mm	0.108m	1:2	
Sigma	A019	28mm F1.4 DG HSM | Art	2018-09	28mm	f/1.4	f/16	No	925g	77mm	82.8mm	133.7mm	0.28m	1:5.4	
Sigma	A025	35mm F1.2 DG II | Art	2025-09	35mm	f/1.2	f/16	No	750g	72mm	81.0mm	111.4mm	0.28m	1:5.3	
Sigma	A019	35mm F1.2 DG DN | Art	2019-07	35mm	f/1.2	f/16	No	1080g	82mm	87.8mm	138.2mm	0.30m	1:5.1	
Sigma	A012	35mm F1.4 DG HSM | Art	2018-02	35mm	f/1.4	f/16	No	755g	67mm	77mm	120mm	0.30m	1:5.2	discontinued
Sigma	A021	35mm F1.4 DG DN | Art	2021-04	35mm	f/1.4	f/16	No	640g	67mm	75.5mm	111.5mm	0.30m	1:5.4	
Sigma	A026	35mm F1.4 DG II | Art	2026-02	35mm	f/1.4	f/16	No	525g	67mm	73.0mm	96.0mm	0.28m	1:5.4	
Sigma	C020	35mm F2 DG DN | Contemporary (I series)	2020-12	35mm	f/2	f/22	No	325g	58mm	70mm	67.4mm	0.27m	1:5.7	
Sigma	A018	40mm F1.4 DG HSM | Art	2018-09	40mm	f/1.4	f/16	No	1260g	82mm	87.8mm	157mm	0.40m	1:6.5	
Sigma	C019	45mm F2.8 DG DN | Contemporary (I series)	2019-07	45mm	f/2.8	f/22	No	230g	55mm	64.0mm	48.2mm	0.24m	1:4	
Sigma	A024	50mm F1.2 DG DN | Art	2024-03	50mm	f/1.2	f/16	No	740g	72mm	81.0mm	110.8mm	0.40m	1:6.2	
Sigma	A014	50mm F1.4 DG HSM | Art	2018-02	50mm	f/1.4	f/16	No	880g	77mm	85.4mm	125.9mm	0.40m	1:5.6	
Sigma	A023	50mm F1.4 DG DN | Art	2023-02	50mm	f/1.4	f/16	No	660g	72mm	78.2mm	111.5mm	0.45m	1:6.8	
Sigma	C027	50mm F1.4 CL DG | Contemporary	2026-10	50mm	f/1.4	f/16	No	375g	52mm	64.7mm	56.0mm	0.45m	1:6.8	
Sigma	C023	50mm F2 DG DN | Contemporary (I series)	2023-04	50mm	f/2	f/22	No	345g	58mm	70.0mm	70.0mm	0.45m	1:6.9	
Sigma	C020	65mm F2 DG DN | Contemporary (I series)	2020-12	65mm	f/2	f/22	No	405g	62mm	72mm	76.7mm	0.55m	1:6.8	
Sigma	A018	70mm F2.8 DG Macro | Art	2018-08	70mm	f/2.8	f/22	No	570g	49mm	70.8mm	131.8mm	0.258m	1:1	
Sigma	A026	85mm F1.2 DG | Art	2026-09	85mm	f/1.2	f/16	No	905g	82mm	87.2mm	121.7mm	0.84m	1:8.9	
Sigma	A020	85mm F1.4 DG DN | Art	2020-08	85mm	f/1.4	f/16	No	625g	77mm	82.8mm	96.1mm	0.85m	1:8.4	
Sigma	A016	85mm F1.4 DG HSM | Art	2018-02	85mm	f/1.4	f/16	No	1210g	86mm	94.7mm	152.2mm	0.85m	1:8.5	discontinued
Sigma	C021	90mm F2.8 DG DN | Contemporary (I series)	2021-09	90mm	f/2.8	f/22	No	295g	55mm	64mm	61.7mm	0.50m	1:5	
Sigma	A018	105mm F1.4 DG HSM | Art	2018-02	105mm	f/1.4	f/16	No	1720g	105mm	115.9mm	157.5mm	1.00m	1:8.3	
Sigma	A020	105mm F2.8 DG DN Macro | Art	2020-09	105mm	f/2.8	f/22	No	710g	62mm	74mm	135.6mm	0.295m	1:1	
Sigma	A025	135mm F1.4 DG | Art	2025-09	135mm	f/1.4	f/16	No	1420g	105mm	111.7mm	137.5mm	0.110m	1:6.9	
Sigma	A017	135mm F1.8 DG HSM | Art	2017-02	135mm	f/1.8	f/16	No	1200g	82mm	91.4mm	140.9mm	0.875m	1:5	
Sigma	S025	200mm F2 DG OS | Sports	2025-08	200mm	f/2	f/22	Yes	1800g	105mm	118.9mm	203.0mm	1.70m	1:7.6	
Sigma	S024	500mm F5.6 DG DN OS | Sports	2024-02	500mm	f/5.6	f/32	Yes	1365g	95mm	107.6mm	236.6mm	3.2m	1:6	
Sirui	AU15-E	Aurora 15mm F1.6	2026-11	15mm	f/1.6	f/16	No	542g	77mm	76mm	106.4mm	0.3m	1:12.5	
Sirui	SW20-E	Swift 20mm F2.4	2026-10	20mm	f/2.4	f/16	No	207g	58mm	69.5mm	62.3mm	0.2m	1:7.327	
Sirui	AU24-E	Aurora 24mm F1.4	2026-11	24mm	f/1.4	f/16	No	550g	62mm	76mm	106.6mm	0.26m	1:6.667	
Sirui	AU35-E	Aurora 35mm F1.4	2025-09	35mm	f/1.4	f/16	No	490g	62mm	76mm	102.9mm	0.35m	1:7.14	
Sirui	SW40-E	Swift 40mm F2.2	2026-10	40mm	f/2.2	f/16	No	210g	58mm	69.4mm	62.3mm	0.4m	1:7.3	
Sirui	AST-50-EN	Astra 50mm T1.8 1.33x Anamorphic	2025-11	50mm	T1.8	T22	No	620g	67mm	72mm	131mm	0.5m	1:7.2(V); 1:10.2(H)	
Sirui	AST-75-EN	Astra 75mm T1.8 1.33x Anamorphic	2025-11	75mm	T1.8	T22	No	650g	67mm	72mm	131mm	0.6m	1:6.1(V); 1:8.1(H)	
Sirui	AU85-E	Aurora 85mm F1.4	2024-10	85mm	f/1.4	f/16	No	540g	67mm	80.3mm	102mm	0.85m	1:8.7	
Sirui	AST-100-EN	Astra 100mm T1.8 1.33x Anamorphic	2025-11	100mm	T1.8	T22	No	700g	67mm	72mm	135.3mm	0.7m	1:7.5(V); 1:10.0(H)	
SongRaw		AF 50mm F1.2	2025-04	50mm	f/1.2	f/16	No	900g	72mm	90mm	129mm	0.52m	1:7.7	
Tamron	F050	20mm F/2.8 Di III OSD M1:2	2019-10	20mm	f/2.8	f/22	No	220g	67mm	73mm	64mm	0.11m	1:2	
Tamron	F051	24mm F/2.8 Di III OSD M1:2	2019-10	24mm	f/2.8	f/22	No	215g	67mm	73mm	64mm	0.12m	1:2	
Tamron	F053	35mm F/2.8 Di III OSD M1:2	2019-10	35mm	f/2.8	f/22	No	210g	67mm	73mm	64mm	0.15m	1:2	
Tamron	F072	90mm F/2.8 Di III MACRO VXD	2024-10	90mm	f/2.8	f/16	No	630g	67mm	79.2mm	126.5mm	0.23m	1:1	
Tokina		FíRIN 20mm F2 FE AF	2018-04	20mm	f/2	f/22	No	464g	62mm	73.8mm	81.5mm	0.28m	1:10.29	the autofocus version of the similar manual focus Tokina FÍRIN 20mm f/2 FE MF
Tokina		atx-m 85mm F1.8 FE	2020-01	85mm	f/1.8	f/16	No	645g	72mm	93.23mm	80mm	0.8m	1:8	
Tokina		FíRIN 100mm F2.8 FE MACRO	2019-04	100mm	f/2.8	f/32	No	570g	55mm	74mm	123mm	0.3m	1:1	
TTArtisan		AF 24mm F3.8 mini	2026-10	24mm	f/3.8		No	57g	—N/a	60mm	16mm	0.3m		
TTArtisan		AF 40mm F2	2025-08	40mm	f/2	f/16	No	167g	52mm	61mm	44mm	0.4m	1:7.7	
TTArtisan		AF 75mm F2	2024-09	75mm	f/2	f/16	No	328g	62mm	67mm	74mm	0.75m	?	
TTArtisan		AF 85mm F1.8 Neo	2026-08	85mm	f/1.8	f/16	No	332g	62mm	70mm	90.5mm	0.8m	?	
Viltrox		AF 14mm F4.0 Air	2025-09	14mm	f/4	f/16	No	170g	58mm	65mm	56.4mm	0.13m	1:4.3	
Viltrox		AF 16/1.8 FE	2023-05	16mm	f/1.8	f/22	No	560g	77mm	85mm	103mm	0.27m	1:9.3	
Viltrox		AF 20/2.8 FE	2023-10	20mm	f/2.8	f/16	No	157g	52mm	65mm	59.5mm	0.19m	1:5.9	
Viltrox		AF 24/1.8 FE	2020-12	24mm	f/1.8	f/16	No	340g	55mm	70mm	85mm	0.3m	1:10	
Viltrox		AF 26mm F2.8 EVO	2026-07	26mm	f/2.8	f/16	No	130g	43mm	66mm	23.8mm	0.2m	1:5	
Viltrox		AF 28/1.8 FE	2023-08	28mm	f/1.8	f/16	No	367g	55mm	70mm	88.2mm	0.37m	1:10	
Viltrox		AF 28mm F4.5 FE	2024-10	28mm	f/4.5		No	60g	—N/a	60.3mm	15.3mm	0.32m	1:9.1	
Viltrox		AF 35mm F1.2 LAB	2025-04	35mm	f/1.2	f/22	No	910g	77mm	89.2mm	121.8mm	0.34m	1:5.9	
Viltrox		AF 35mm F1.4 Pro	2026-10	35mm	f/1.4	f/16	No	760g	77mm	84.5mm	111mm	0.3m	1:5.6	
Viltrox		AF 35mm F1.8 EVO	2026-04	35mm	f/1.8	f/16	No	355g	58mm	69mm	76mm	0.34m	1:6.7	
Viltrox		AF 35/1.8 FE	2021-12	35mm	f/1.8	f/16	No	340g	55mm	70mm	88.2mm	0.40m	1:10	
Viltrox		AF 40mm F2.5	2024-08	40mm	f/2.5	f/16	No	167g	52mm	65mm	59.5mm	0.34m	?	
Viltrox		AF 50mm F1.4 Pro	2025-10	50mm	f/1.4	f/16	No	800g	77mm	84.5mm	111mm	0.45m	1:6.9	
Viltrox		AF 50/1.8 FE	2021-12	50mm	f/1.8	f/16	No	390g	55mm	70mm	88.2mm	0.55m	1:10	
Viltrox		AF 50mm F2.0 Air	2025-04	50mm	f/2	f/16	No	205g	58mm	65mm	56.5mm	0.51m	1:9.1	
Viltrox		AF 55mm F1.8 EVO	2026-04	55mm	f/1.8	f/16	No	370g	58mm	69mm	76mm	0.43m	1:6.7	
Viltrox		AF 85mm F1.4 Pro	2025-06	85mm	f/1.4	f/16	No	800g	77mm	84.5mm	108.5mm	0.79m	1:7.7	
Viltrox		PFU RBMH 85MM F1.8 STM	2019-04	85mm	f/1.8	f/16	No	626g	72mm	80mm	92mm	0.8m	1:8	the autofocus version of the similar full frame manual focus PFU RBMH 85mm f/1.8
Viltrox		AF 85mm F1.8 II	2021-04	85mm	f/1.8	f/16	No	484g	72mm	80mm	92mm	0.8m	1:8	
Viltrox		AF 85mm F2.0 EVO	2025-10	85mm	f/2	f/16	No	340g	58mm	69mm	76mm	0.74m	1:7.7	
Viltrox		AF 135mm F1.8 LAB	2024-11	135mm	f/1.8	f/16	No	1235g	82mm	93mm	145.7mm	0.72m	1:4	
Yongnuo		YN35mm F2S DF DSM	2020-10	35mm	f/2	f/16	No	295g	52mm	67mm	72mm	0.35m	1:7.7	
Yongnuo		YN50mm F1.8S DF DSM	2021-11	50mm	f/1.8	f/22	No	395g	58mm	68mm	85mm	0.45m	1:6.7	
Yongnuo		YN85mm F1.8S DF DSM	2020-08	85mm	f/1.8	f/16	No	346g	58mm	67mm	88mm	0.8m	1:7.7	
Yongnuo		85F1.8S DF DSM	2022-11	85mm	f/1.8	f/16	No	385g	58mm	67mm	87mm	0.8m	1:7.7	Metal casing version of YN85mm F1.8S DF DSM
Zeiss		Batis Distagon T* 18mm f/2.8	2016-04	18mm	f/2.8	f/22	No	330g	77mm	100mm	80mm	0.25m	1:9.5	
Zeiss		Batis Distagon T* 25mm f/2.0	2015-04	25mm	f/2	f/22	No	335g	67mm	81mm	78mm	0.2m	1:5.2	
Zeiss		Batis Sonnar T* 40mm f/2.0	2018-10	40mm	f/2	f/22	No	361g	67mm	91mm	93mm	0.24m	1:3.3	
Zeiss		Batis Sonnar T* 85mm f/1.8	2015-04	85mm	f/1.8	f/22	Yes	452g	67mm	92mm	92mm	0.80m	1:7.9	
Zeiss		Batis Sonnar T* 135mm f/2.8	2017-04	135mm	f/2.8	f/22	Yes	614g	67mm	98mm	120mm	0.87m	1:5.3	

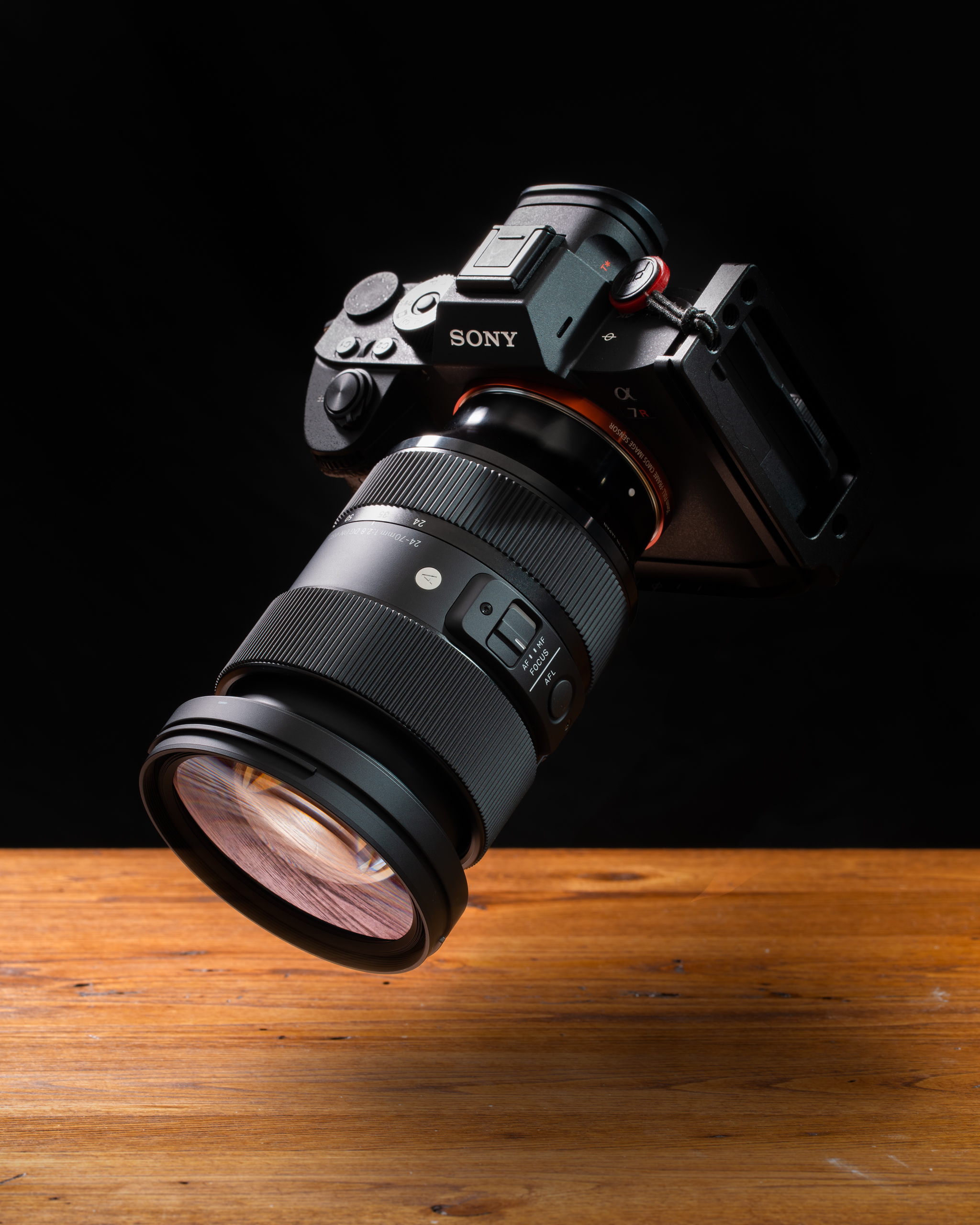
Sony α7R III with Sigma 24-70 f/2.8 Art lens.

==== Zoom lenses ====
Brand	Ref.	Model	Intro.	Focal Length		Aperture				Opt. Stab.	Wgt	Filter Size	⌀	L	Min Focus		Magnification		Notes
Brand	Ref.	Model	Intro.	Focal Length		Wide Angle		Telephoto		Opt. Stab.	Wgt	Filter Size	⌀	L	Min Focus		Magnification		Notes
Brand	Ref.	Model	Intro.	Min	Max	Max	Min	Max	Min	Opt. Stab.	Wgt	Filter Size	⌀	L	Wide Angle	Telephoto	Wide Angle	Telephoto	Notes
Samyang & Schneider Kreuznach		AF 14-24mm F2.8 FE	2025-04	14mm	24mm	f/2.8	f/22	f/2.8	f/22	No	445g	77mm	84mm	88.8mm (T); 98.63mm (W)	0.18m		1:5.84	1:3.92	
Samyang & Schneider Kreuznach		AF 24-60mm F2.8 FE	2025-09	24mm	60mm	f/2.8	f/22	f/2.8	f/22	No	494g	72mm	78mm	102mm (W); 126mm (T)	0.18m	0.32m	1:3.73	1:4.01	
Samyang		AF 24-70mm F2.8 FE	2021-10	24mm	70mm	f/2.8	f/22	f/2.8	f/22	No	1027g	82mm	88.0mm	128.5mm	0.35m		1:10	1:3.7	
Samyang		AF 35-150mm F2-2.8 FE	2023-04	35mm	150mm	f/2	f/16	f/2.8	f/22	No	1224g	82mm	92.8mm	157.4mm (W); 197.9mm (T)	0.33m	0.85m	1:5.7	1:5.5	
Samyang & Schneider Kreuznach		AF 60-180mm F2.8 FE	2026-11	60mm	180mm	f/2.8	f/22	f/2.8	f/22	No	730g	77mm	86.7mm	149.0mm (W); 174.4mm (T)	0.35m	0.79m	1:3.80	1:4.71	
Sigma	A019	14-24mm F2.8 DG DN | Art	2019-07	14mm	24mm	f/2.8	f/22	f/2.8	f/22	No	795g	—N/a	85.0mm	133.0mm	0.28m	?	1:7.3	?	
Sigma	C022	16-28mm F2.8 DG DN | Contemporary	2022-06	16mm	28mm	f/2.8	f/22	f/2.8	f/22	No	450g	72mm	77.2mm	102.6mm	0.25m	?	1:5.6	?	
Sigma	C026	20-60mm F2.8-4 DG | Contemporary	2026-09	20mm	60mm	f/2.8	f/22	f/4	f/32	No	375g	67mm	72.2mm	88.0mm	0.20m 0.158m @f=28mm	0.25m	1:2.3 @f=35mm	1:2.9	
Sigma	C025	20-200mm F3.5-6.3 DG | Contemporary	2025-09	20mm	200mm	f/3.5	f/22	f/6.3	f/40	No	540g	72mm	77.2mm	117.5mm	0.25m 0.165m at f=28mm	0.65m	1:2 at f=28-85mm		
Sigma	A019	24-70mm F2.8 DG DN | Art	2019-11	24mm	70mm	f/2.8	f/22	f/2.8	f/22	No	830g	82mm	87.8mm	124.9mm	0.18m	0.38m	1:2.9	1:4.5	
Sigma	A024	24-70mm F2.8 DG DN II | Art	2024-05	24mm	70mm	f/2.8	f/22	f/2.8	f/22	No	735g	82mm	87.8mm	122.2mm	0.17m	0.34m	1:2.7	1:4	
Sigma	A024	28-45mm F1.8 DG DN | Art	2024-06	28mm	45mm	f/1.8	f/16	f/1.8	f/16	No	950g	82mm	87.8mm	153.4mm	0.30m	0.30m	?	1:4 (at 45mm)	
Sigma	C021	28-70mm F2.8 DG DN | Contemporary	2021-02	28mm	70mm	f/2.8	f/22	f/2.8	f/22	No	470g	67mm	72.2mm	103.5mm	0.19m	0.38m	1:3.3	1:4.6	
Sigma	A024	28-105mm F2.8 DG DN | Art	2024-09	28mm	105mm	f/2.8	f/22	f/2.8	f/22	No	990g	82mm	87.8mm	159.9mm	0.40m	0.40m	?	1:3.1 (at 105mm)	
Sigma	S023	60-600mm F4.5-6.3 DG DN OS | Sports	2023-01	60mm	600mm	f/4.5	f/22	f/6.3	f/32	Yes	2485g	105mm	119.4mm	281.2mm	0.45m	2.60m	?	1:2.4 (at 200mm)	
Sigma	S023	70-200mm F2.8 DG DN OS | Sports	2023-11	70mm	200mm	f/2.8	f/22	f/2.8	f/22	Yes	1335g	77mm	90.6mm	207.0mm	0.65m	1.00m	?	1:5.2 (at 200mm)	
Sigma	C020	100-400mm F5-6.3 DG DN OS | Contemporary	2020-06	100mm	400mm	f/5	f/22	f/6.3	f/29	Yes	1140g	67mm	86.0mm	199.2mm	1.12m	1.60m	?	1:4.1 (at 400mm)	
Sigma	S021	150-600mm F5-6.3 DG DN OS | Sport	2021-08	150mm	600mm	f/5	f/22	f/6.3	f/29	Yes	2100g	95mm	109.4mm	265.6mm	0.58m	2.80m	1:2.9	?	
Sigma	S025	300-600mm F4 DG OS | Sports	2025-02	300mm	600mm	f/4	f/22	f/4	f/22	Yes	3970g	40.5mm	167.0mm	469.9mm	2.80m	4.50m	1:6 (at 470mm)		
Tamron	A084	12-20mm F2.8	2026-07	12mm	20mm	f/2.8	f/16	f/2.8	f/16	No	570g	—N/a	90mm	119.3mm	0.18m	0.28m	1:5.8	1:9.1	
Tamron	A064	16-30mm F/2.8 Di III VXD G2	2025-07	16mm	30mm	f/2.8	f/16	f/2.8	f/16	No	440g	67mm	74.8mm	101.8mm	0.19m	0.3m	1:5.4	1:7	
Tamron	A046	17-28mm F/2.8 Di III RXD	2019-02	17mm	28mm	f/2.8	f/22	f/2.8	f/22	No	420g	67mm	73mm	99mm	0.19m	0.26m	1:5.2	1:6	
Tamron	A068	17-50mm F/4 Di III VXD	2023-10	17mm	50mm	f/4	f/22	f/4	f/22	No	460g	67mm	74.8mm	114.4mm	0.19m	0.3m	1:4.6	1:3.8	
Tamron	A062	20-40mm F/2.8 Di III VXD	2022-09	20mm	40mm	f/2.8	f/22	f/2.8	f/22	No	365g	67mm	74.4mm	85.5mm	0.17m	0.29m	1:3.8	1:5.1	
Tamron	A075	25-200mm F2.8-5.6 G2	2025-10	25mm	200mm	f/2.8	f/16	f/5.6	f/32	No	575g	67mm	76.2mm	121.5mm	0.16m	0.8m	1:1.9	1:3.9	
Tamron	A036	28-75mm F/2.8 Di III RXD	2018-02	28mm	75mm	f/2.8	f/22	f/2.8	f/22	No	550g	67mm	73mm	117.8mm	0.19m	0.39m	1:2.9	1:4	replaced by A063
Tamron	A063	28-75mm F/2.8 Di III VXD G2	2021-08	28mm	75mm	f/2.8	f/22	f/2.8	f/22	No	540g	67mm	75.8mm	117.6mm	0.18m	0.38m	1:2.7	1:4.1	successor of A036
Tamron	A071	28-200mm F/2.8-5.6 Di III RXD	2020-06	28mm	200mm	f/2.8	f/16	f/5.6	f/32	No	575g	67mm	74mm	117mm	0.19m	0.8m	1:3.1	1:3.8	
Tamron	A074	28-300mm F/4-7.1 Di III VC VXD	2024-07	28mm	300mm	f/4	f/22	f/7.1	f/40	Yes	610g	67mm	77mm	126mm	0.19m	0.99m	1:2.8	1:3.8	
Tamron	A078	35-100mm F/2.8 Di III VXD	2026-02	35mm	100mm	f/2.8	f/22	f/2.8	f/22	No	565g	67mm	80.6mm	119.2mm	0.22m	0.65m	1:3.3	1:5.9	
Tamron	A058	35-150mm F/2-2.8 Di III VXD	2021-08	35mm	150mm	f/2	f/16	f/2.8	f/22	No	1165g	82mm	89.2mm	158mm	0.33m	0.85m	1:5.7	1:5.9	
Tamron	A056	70-180mm F/2.8 Di III VXD	2019-10	70mm	180mm	f/2.8	f/22	f/2.8	f/22	No	810g	67mm	81mm	149mm	0.85m	0.85m	1:4.6	1:4.6	
Tamron	A065	70-180mm F/2.8 Di III VC VXD G2	2023-10	70mm	180mm	f/2.8	f/22	f/2.8	f/22	Yes	855g	67mm	83mm	156.5mm	0.3m	0.85m	1:2.6	1:4.7	
Tamron	A047	70-300mm F/4.5-6.3 Di III RXD	2020-09	70mm	300mm	f/4.5	f/22	f/6.3	f/32	No	545g	67mm	77mm	148mm	0.8m	1.5m	1:9.4	1:5.1	
Tamron	A069	50-300mm F/4.5-6.3 Di III VC VXD	2024-06	50mm	300mm	f/4.5	f/22	f/6.3	f/32	Yes	665g	67mm	78mm	150mm	0.22m	0.9m	1:2	1:3.1	
Tamron	A067	50-400mm F/4.5-6.3 Di III VC VXD	2022-09	50mm	400mm	f/4.5	f/22	f/6.3	f/32	Yes	1155g	67mm	77mm	183.4mm	0.25m	1.5m	1:2	1:4	
Tamron	A057	150-500mm F/5-6.7 Di III VC VXD	2021-04	150mm	500mm	f/5	f/22	f/6.7	f/32	Yes	1725g	82mm	93mm	209.6mm	0.6m	1.8m	1:3.1	1:3.7	
Thypoch		Voyager AF 24-50mm f/2.8	2026-05	24mm	50mm	f/2.8	f/22	f/2.8	f/22	No	432g	67mm	70mm	92.8mm	0.3m		1:4.63		

== Manual focus, electronic aperture reporting ==
The following lenses have either manually or electronically actuated apertures and can report the aperture value and focal length for inclusion in Exif data and SteadyShot calculations.

=== Full-frame lenses ===
- Meike
  - 85mm f/1.8 (no aperture ring)
- Sigma
  - 18mm T1.3 (announced 2025-06)
  - 21mm T1.3 (announced 2025-06)
  - 25mm T1.3 (2025-08)
  - 27mm T1.3 (2025-08)
  - 32mm T1.3 (2025-08)
  - 35mm T1.3 (2025-08)
  - 40mm T1.3 (2025-08)
  - 50mm T1.3 (2025-08)
  - 65mm T1.3 (2025-08)
  - 75mm T1.3 (2025-08)
  - 100mm T1.3 (announced 2025-06)
  - 125mm T1.3 (announced 2025-06)
- Tokina
  - FíRIN 20mm F/2.0 FE MF
- Viltrox
  - PFU RBMH 85mm f/1.8 (no aperture ring)
- Voigtländer
  - 10mm f/5.6 Hyper-Wide-Heliar (announced 2015–10)
  - 12mm f/5.6 Ultra-Wide-Heliar (announced 2015–10)
  - 15mm f/4.5 Super-Wide-Heliar (announced 2015–10)
  - 21mm f/1.4 Nokton E
  - 21mm f/3.5 Color Skopar E
  - 28mm f/1.5 Nokton (announced 2024-12)
  - 28mm F2 APO-Lanthar Aspherical (announced 2025-11)
  - 35mm f/1.2 Aspherical Nokton (announced 2026-11)
  - 35mm f/1.4 Classic Nokton (announced 2017–02)
  - 35mm f/2.0 APO-Lanthar Aspherical (announced 2021–02)
  - 40mm f/2 Septon Aspherical (2026-02)
  - 40mm f/2.8 Heliar
  - 40mm f/1.2 Nokton (announced 2017–02)
  - 50mm f/1 Aspherical (2024)
  - 50mm f/1.2 Nokton Aspherical (announced 2019–04)
  - 50mm f/2 Aspherical (2019)
  - 65mm f/2.0 Macro APO-Lanthar (announced 2017–02)
  - 75mm f/1.5 Aspherical (2024)
  - 110mm f/2.5 Macro APO-Lanthar
- Zeiss
  - Loxia (discontinued 2025-09)
    - Distagon T* 2.8/21mm (announced 2015–10)
    - Distagon 2.4/25 (announced 2018–02)
    - Biogon T* 2/35mm (announced 2014–09)
    - Planar T* 2/50mm (announced 2014–09)
    - Sonnar T* 2.4/85mm (announced 2016–09)
  - Nano Prime T1.5
    - 18 mm (announced 2024-02)
    - 24 mm (announced 2024-02)
    - 35 mm (announced 2024-02)
    - 50 mm (announced 2024-02)
    - 75 mm (announced 2024-02)
    - 100 mm (announced 2024-02)
  - Otus ML f/1.4
    - 35mm (2026-02)
    - 50mm (announced 2025-02)
    - 85mm (2025-02)

== Fully manual, no electronics ==
=== APS-C lenses ===
- 7artisans
  - Photo lens
    - 4mm f/2.8 circular fisheye
    - 6mm f/2 Fisheye (2025-12)
    - 7.5mm f/2.8 ultra-wide angle fisheye
    - 12mm f/2.8
    - 12mm f/2.8 II
    - 18mm f/6.3
    - 25mm f/0.95 Firefly Series
    - 25mm f/1.8
    - 35mm f/0.95 Firefly Series
    - 35mm f/1.2
    - 35mm f/1.2 II
    - 35mm f/1.4
    - 35mm f/2.0
    - 50mm f/0.95 Firefly Series
    - 50mm f/1.2 (2025-12)
    - 50mm f/1.8
    - 55mm f/1.4
    - 55mm f/1.4 II
    - 60mm f/2.8 Macro
    - 60mm f/2.8 II Macro
  - Cine lens
    - 12mm T2.9 Vision Series
    - 25mm T1.05 Vision Series
    - 35mm T1.05 Vision Series
    - 50mm T1.05 Vision Series
- Digital King
  - 12mm f/7.4 Fisheye
- Fujifilm
  - FUJINON MK 18-55mm T2.9
  - FUJINON MK 50-135mm T2.9
- HandeVision
  - Ibelux 40mm f/0.85
- Holga
  - HPL-SN pinhole lens, 0.25mm aperture size
  - HL(W)-SN 25mm f/8 fixed aperture
  - HLT-SN special lens with 18 effects
- Lensbaby
  - 5.8mm f/3.5 CIRCULAR FISHEYE
  - Composer Pro II 50mm f/3.2
- Kamlan
  - Kamlan 8mm f/3.0 fisheye lens
  - Kamlan 21mm f/1.8
  - Kamlan 28mm f/1.4
  - Kamlan 32mm f/1.1 (announced 2020–02)
  - Kamlan 50mm f/1.1 (announced 2017–06)
  - Kamlan 50mm f/1.1 Mark 2 (released 2019–06)
- Meike
  - 6-11mm f/3.5 fisheye zoom
  - 6.5mm f/2 circular fisheye
  - 10mm f/2.0
  - 12mm f/2.0
  - 12mm f/2.8
  - 25mm f/0.95
  - 25mm f/1.8
  - 25mm f/2
  - 25mm T2.2 cine
  - 28mm f/2.8 pancake
  - 35mm f/1.4
  - 35mm f/1.7
  - 50mm f/0.95
  - 50mm f/2.0
- Neewer
  - 25mm f/0.95
  - 25mm f/1.8
  - 28mm f/2.8
  - 32mm f/1.6
  - 35mm f/1.2
  - 35mm f/1.7
  - 50mm f/2.0
- Pergear
  - 25mm F1.8
  - 35mm F1.6
  - 50mm F1.2 (2025-12)
  - 50mm F1.8
- Photex
  - MC 50mm f/2 Tilt-Shift
- Samyang Optics / Rokinon
  - Cine Lens
    - 8mm T3.1 Cine UMC FISH-EYE II Cine Lens
    - 8mm T3.8 VDSLR UMC Fish-eye CS II Cine Lens
    - 10mm T3.1 VDSLR ED AS NCS CS II Cine Lens
    - 12mm T2.2 Cine NCS CS Cine Lens
    - 16mm T2.2 VDSLR ED AS UMC CS II Cine Lens
    - 21mm T1.5 ED AS UMC CS Cine Lens
    - 35mm T1.3 AS UMC CS Cine Lens
    - 50mm T1.3 AS UMC CS Cine Lens
  - Photo Lens
    - 8mm f/2.8 UMC Fisheye
    - 8mm f/2.8 UMC Fish-eye II
    - 8mm f/3.5 Fisheye CS VG10
    - 8mm f/3.5 UMC Fish-Eye CS II
    - 10mm f/2.8 ED AS NCS CS
    - 12mm f/2.0 NCS CS
    - 16mm f/2.0
    - 21mm f/1.4
    - 35mm f/1.2
    - 50mm f/1.2 AS UMC CS
    - 85mm f/1.8 ED UMC CS
    - 100mm f/2.0 ED UMC Macro
    - 135mm f/2.0
    - 300mm f/6.3 ED UMC CS mirror lens
- Shenyang Zhongyi Mitakon
  - Freewalker 24mm f/1.7
  - Speedmaster 35mm f/0.95
- SIRUI
  - Cine Lens
    - 24mm F2.8 Anamorphic 1.33X (2020-12)
    - 35mm F1.8 Anamorphic 1.33X (2020-05)
    - 50mm F1.8 Anamorphic 1.33X (2020-02)
    - 75mm F1.8 Anamorphic 1.33X (2021-05)
- SLR Magic
  - CINE 12mm F2.8
  - HyperPrime 23mm F1.7 (Announced for Feb 2013)
  - HyperPrime CINE 35mm T0.95
  - HyperPrime CINE II 35mm f/1.4
  - HyperPrime 50mm F0.95
- Tokina
  - SZ 8mm F2.8 E FISH-EYE
  - SZ 33mm F1.2 E
- TTartisan
  - 7.5mm F2 (2021-07)
- Venus Optics
  - Laowa 4mm f/2.8 Fisheye (announced 2018–04)
  - Laowa 9mm f/2.8 Zero-D (announced 2018–03)
  - Laowa 10mm f/4 Cookie (announced 2022–07)
  - Laowa Argus 25mm f/0.95 CF APO (announced 2022–10)
  - Laowa Argus 33mm f/0.95 CF APO (announced 2020–03)
  - Laowa 65mm f/2.8 2x Ultra Macro APO (announced 2020–01)
- Veydra
  - Cine Lens
    - Veydra 25mm T2.2
    - Veydra 35mm T2.2
    - Veydra 50mm T2.2
- Viltrox
  - Cine lens
    - S 23mm T1.5 E
    - S 33mm T1.5 E
    - S 56mm T1.5 E
- Yasuhara
  - Nanoha 4x-5x macro lens with built-in LED light ("Nanohax5(E)")
  - MADOKA180(E) 7.3mm f/4.0 (circular fisheye)
  - MOMO 28mm f/6.4 Soft focus lens
- Zonlai
  - Zonlai 14mm f/2
  - Zonlai 22mm f/1.8
  - Zonlai 25mm f/1.8
  - Zonlai 35mm f/1.6
  - Zonlai 35mm f/1.8
  - Zonlai 50mm f/1.4

=== Full-frame lenses ===
- 7artisans
  - Photo lens
    - 10mm f/2.8
    - 35mm f/5.6 (Aviation edition) lens
    - 35mm f/1.4 II
    - 50mm f/1.05
  - Cine lens
    - 35mm T2.0 Spectrum Series
    - 50mm T2.0 Spectrum Series
    - 85mm T2.0 Spectrum Series
- Arax
  - 50mm f/2.0 Tilt Shift lens
- Artboard
  - Funleader 18mm f/8 LensCap
- AstrHori
  - 6mm F2.8 Full-frame Circular Fisheye
  - 50mm F1.4 Full-frame Tilt
- Brightin Star
  - 50mm F0.95 II (2025-11)
  - 50mm F1.05 (2026-01)
  - 50mm F2.0 Tri-Sight (2026-09)
- DZOptics
  - Kerlee 35mm f/1.2
- Entaniya
  - Entaniya Fisheye HAL200 (200 °FOV)
  - Entaniya Fisheye HAL250 (250 °FOV)
- Handevision
  - Iberit 24mm f/2.4
  - Iberit 35mm f/2.4
  - Iberit 50mm f/2.4
  - Iberit 75mm f/2.4
  - Iberit 90mm f/2.4
- Lensbaby
  - 28mm f/3.5 TRIO 28
  - 35mm f/3.5 COMPOSER PRO II WITH EDGE 35 OPTIC
  - 35mm f/3.5 EDGE 35 OPTIC
  - 35mm f/2.8 BURNSIDE 35
  - 35mm f/2.5 COMPOSER PRO II WITH SWEET 35 OPTIC
  - 45mm f/3.5 SOL 45
  - 50mm f/2.5 COMPOSER PRO II WITH SWEET 50 OPTIC
  - 50mm f/3.2 COMPOSER PRO II WITH EDGE 50 OPTIC
  - 56mm f/1.6VELVET 56
  - 60mm f/2.5 TWIST 60
  - 85mm f/1.8 VELVET 85
- Meike
  - 6-11mm f/3.5 zoom circular fisheye
  - 8mm f/3.5 fisheye
  - 50mm f/1.2
  - 50mm f/1.7
  - 85mm f/1.8
  - 85mm f/2.8 macro
- Meyer-Optik-Görlitz
  - Lydith 30 f/3.5
  - Lydith 30 f/3.5 II
  - Trioplan 35+ f/2.8
  - Trioplan 50 f/2.9
  - Trioplan 50 f/2.8 II
  - Primoplan 58 f/1.9
  - Primoplan 58 f/1.9 II
  - Primoplan 75 f/1.9
  - Primoplan 75 f/1.9 II
  - Trioplan 100mm f/2.8
  - Trioplan 100 f/2.8 II
- Pergear
  - Pergear 35mm f/1.4
- Samyang Optics / Rokinon
  - Cine Lens
    - 12mm T3.1 VDSLR ED AS NCS FISH-EYE Cine Lens
    - 14mm T3.1 Cine Lens
    - 14mm T3.1 VDSLR ED AS IF UMC II Cine Lens
    - 16mm T2.6 ED AS UMC Cine Lens
    - 20mm T1.9 ED AS UMC Cine Lens
    - 24mm T1.5 Cine Lens
    - 24mm T1.5 VDSLR ED AS IF UMC II Cine Lens
    - 35mm T1.5 Cine Lens
    - 35mm T1.5 VDSLR AS UMC II Cine Lens
    - 50mm T1.5 VDSLR AS UMC Cine Lens
    - 85mm T1.5 Cine Lens
    - 85mm T1.5 VDSLR AS IF UMC II Cine Lens
    - 100mm T3.1 VDSLR ED UMC MACRO Cine Lens
    - 135mm T2.2 Cine Lens
  - Photo Lens
    - 12mm f/2.8 UMC Fisheye
    - 14mm f/2.8 UMC
    - 20mm f/1.8 ED AS UMC
    - 24mm f/1.4 UMC
    - Tilt-Shift 24mm f/3.5 UMC
    - 35mm f/1.4 UMC
    - 50mm f/1.4 UMC
    - 85mm f/1.4 Aspherical IF
    - Macro 100mm f/2.8 UMC
    - 135mm f/2.0 UMC
- Shenyang Zhongyi Mitakon
  - Mitakon Creator 20mm f/2 macro 4.5x to 4x
  - Mitakon Creator 35mm f/2
  - Speedmaster 50 mm f/0.95
  - Mitakon Creator 85mm f/2
  - Speedmaster 135mm f/1.4
- SIRUI
  - Cine Lens
    - 35mm T2.9 Anamorphic FF1.6X
    - 50mm T2.9 Anamorphic FF1.6X
    - 75mm T2.9 Anamorphic FF1.6X
    - 100mm T2.9 Anamorphic FF1.6X
- SLR Magic
  - Cine Lens (T-stops)
    - 15mm T3.5 MicroPrime CINE Lens
    - 18mm T2.8 MicroPrime CINE Lens
    - 21mm T1.6 MicroPrime CINE Lens
    - 25mm T1.5 MicroPrime CINE Lens
    - 35mm T1.3 MicroPrime CINE Lens
    - 50mm T1.2 MicroPrime CINE Lens
    - 75mm T1.5 MicroPrime CINE Lens
  - Cine Lens (f-stops)
    - 18mm f/2.8 Cine Lens
    - 21mm f/1.5 Cine Lens
    - 25mm f/1.4 Cine Lens
    - 35mm f/1.2 Cine Lens
    - 50mm f/1.1 Cine Lens
    - 75mm f/1.4 Cine Lens
  - Photo Lens
    - 35mm f/1.7 Lens
- Thingyfy
  - Pinhole Pro S 11mm (pinhole lens) (0.14mm aperture)
  - Pinhole Pro S 26mm (0.1-0.8mm aperture)
  - Pinhole Pro X 18-36mm (F160-240)
- TTartisan
  - 11mm F2.8 Fisheye (2020-01)
  - 17mm f/4 ASPH Tilt-Shift (2025-10)
  - 500mm F6.3 (2023-09)
- Venus Optics
  - Prime
    - Laowa 9mm f/5.6 FF RL (announced 2020–06)
    - Laowa 11mm f/4.5 FF RL (announced 2020–08)
    - Laowa 12mm f/2.8 Zero-D (announced 2016–07)
    - Laowa 14mm f/4 FF RL Zero-D (announced 2020–09)
    - Laowa 15mm f/2 Zero-D (formerly "D-Dreamer") (announced 2016–09)
    - Laowa Argus 35mm f/0.95 FF (announced 2021–01)
    - Laowa Argus 45mm f/0.95 FF (announced 2021–01)
    - Laowa 105mm f/2 Smooth Trans Focus (announced 2016–03)
  - Shift
    - Laowa 15mm f/4.5 Zero-D Shift (announced 2020–10)
    - Laowa 20mm f/4 Zero-D Shift (announced 2022–03)
    - Laowa 24mm f/2 Zero-D Tilt-Shift (2026-11)
    - Laowa 35mm f/2.8 Zero-D Tilt-Shift 0.5× Macro (2025-11)
  - Macro
    - Laowa 15mm f/4 Wide Angle 1:1 Macro (announced 2015–06)
    - Laowa Aksen 17.5mm f/1.7 5-10X Ultra Macro APO (2026-08)
    - Laowa 24mm f/14 2X Macro Probe (2018-08)
    - Laowa 24mm T14 2x PeriProbe (announced 2022–05)
    - Laowa 25mm f/2.8 2.5-5X Ultra Macro (announced 2018–03)
    - Laowa Aksen 45mm f/2.8 1-5X Ultra Macro APO (2026-08)
    - Laowa 58mm f/2.8 2X Ultra-Macro APO (announced 2022–09)
    - Laowa 60mm f/2.8 2X Ultra-Macro (2015)
    - Laowa 85mm f/5.6 2x Ultra Macro APO (announced 2021–11)
    - Laowa 90mm f/2.8 2x Ultra Macro APO (announced 2022–06)
    - Laowa 100mm f/2.8 2x Ultra Macro APO (announced 2018–04)
  - Zoom
    - Laowa 8-15mm f/2.8 FF Zoom Fisheye (2025-06)
    - Laowa 10-18mm f/4.5-5.6 FE Zoom (announced 2018–04)
    - Laowa 12-24mm f/5.6 Zoom (formerly "FF II 12-24mm f/5.6 C-Dreamer Ultra-Wide Zoom") (announced 2021–03)
- Viltrox
  - PFU RBMH 20mm f/1.8 Aspherical
  - S 20mm T2.0 Aspherical Cinematic
- Yasuhara
  - Anthy 35mm f/1.8
- Zeiss
  - Distagon T* Compact Prime CP.2 15 mm/T2.9
  - Distagon T* Compact Prime CP.2 Super Speed 35 mm/T1.5
  - Planar T* Compact Prime CP.2 Super Speed 50 mm/T1.5
  - Planar T* Compact Prime CP.2 Super Speed 85 mm/T1.5
  - Sonnar T* Compact Prime CP.2 135 mm/T2.1
  - T* Compact Zoom CZ.2 70–200 mm/T2.9
- Zenit
  - Zenitar 50mm f/0.95
- Zunow
  - Super Wide Angle SWV-E11-16 11-16mm f/2.8 Cine Lens

== See also ==
- List of Sony E-mount lenses
- List of Minolta A-mount lenses
