= Zeiss Touit Planar T* 1.8/32mm =

Zeiss Touit Planar T* 1.8/32
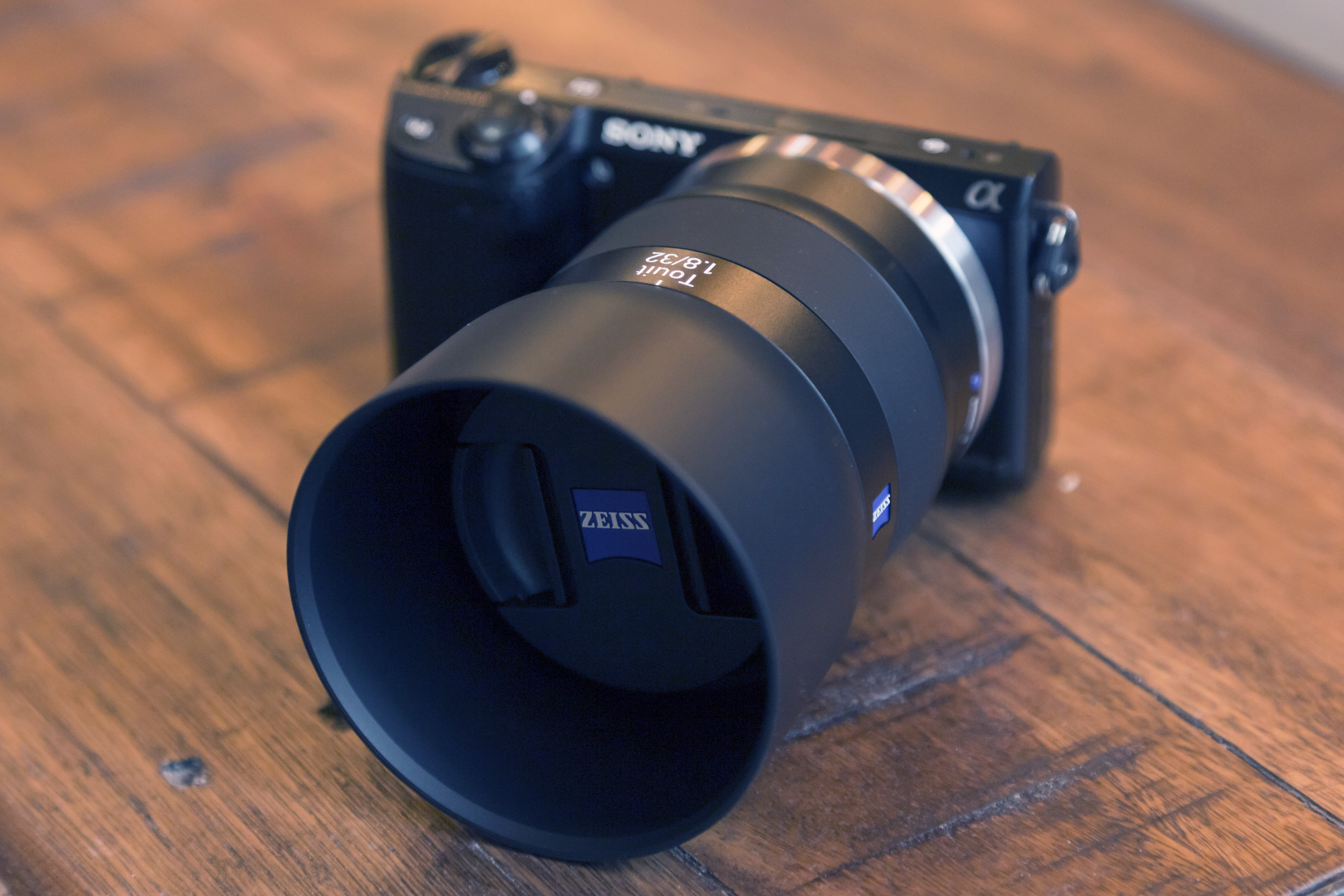
- Zeiss Touit 1.8/32mm lens on Sony NEX-5T
- Maker: Zeiss
- Lens mount(s): Fujifilm X-mount, Sony E-mount

Technical data
- Type: Prime
- Focal length: 32mm
- Focal length (35mm equiv.): 48mm
- Image format: APS-C
- Aperture (max/min): f/1.8
- Close focus distance: 0.30 metres (0.98 ft)
- Max. magnification: 0.11x
- Construction: 10 elements in 8 groups

Features
- Manual focus override: Yes Yes
- Weather-sealing: No No
- Lens-based stabilization: No No
- Aperture ring: No No
- Application: Landscape, Street

Physical
- Max. length: 60 millimetres (2.4 in)
- Diameter: 65 millimetres (2.6 in)
- Weight: 210 grams (0.46 lb)
- Filter diameter: 52mm

History
- Introduction: 2012

Retail info
- MSRP: $720 USD

The Zeiss Touit Planar T* 1.8/32mm is a standard prime lens for Fujifilm X and Sony E mount, announced by Zeiss on September 18, 2012. Along with the Zeiss Touit 2.8/12, it is one of the first two purely Zeiss-branded autofocus models with motor-assisted manual focus.

== Exterior construction ==
The lens features a minimalist matte-black plastic exterior with a Zeiss badge on the side of the barrel and a rubber focus ring.

== Optics ==
The Touit 1.8/32 has "impressive" resolution, low chromatic aberration and "very good" bokeh. Uncorrected, it has 2% barrel distortion and fairly high vignetting.

== Autofocus ==
The lens has a direct current focus motor, and according to Jamiya Wilson of The Phoblographer, focuses "quickly and accurately", and "very quietly".

== See also ==
- List of third-party E-mount lenses
- Fujifilm X-mount Lenses
- Sigma 30mm F1.4 DC DN
- Zeiss Planar
