= Sigma 19mm F2.8 EX DN =

Camera lens

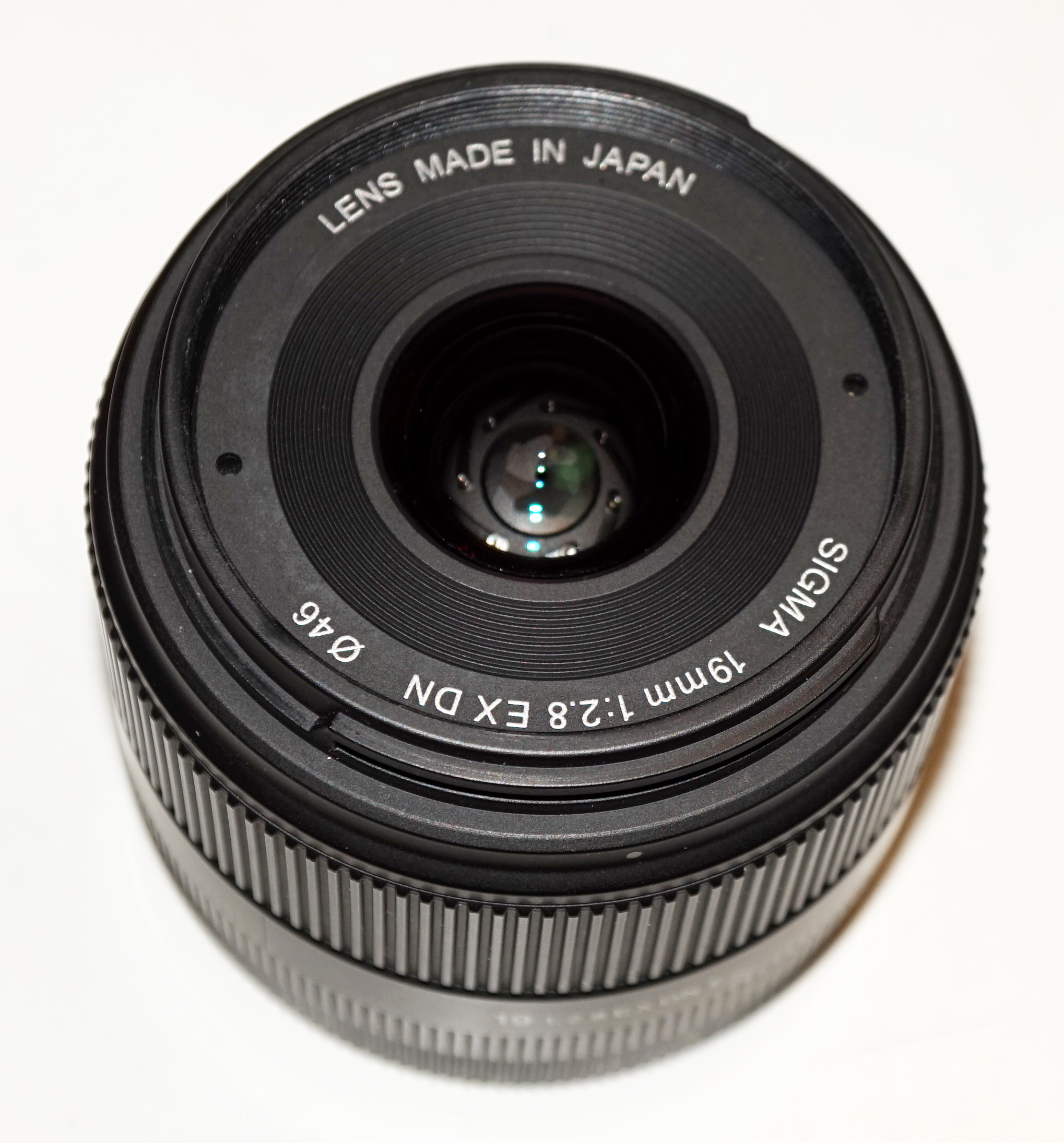
- Maker: Sigma
- Lens mount(s): Sony E-mount, Micro Four Thirds

Technical data
- Type: Prime
- Focus drive: Stepper motor
- Focal length: 19mm
- Focal length (35mm equiv.): 28.5mm
- Image format: APS-C
- Aperture (max/min): f/2.8 - 22.0
- Close focus distance: 0.20 metres (0.66 ft)
- Max. magnification: 0.135x
- Diaphragm blades: 7
- Construction: 8 elements in 6 groups

Features
- Manual focus override: Yes Yes
- Weather-sealing: No No
- Lens-based stabilization: No No
- Aperture ring: No No
- Application: Landscape, Street

Physical
- Max. length: 45.7 millimetres (1.80 in)
- Diameter: 60.8 millimetres (2.39 in)
- Weight: 140 grams (0.31 lb)
- Filter diameter: 46mm

Accessories
- Lens hood: LH520-03, Barrel-type

History
- Introduction: 2012

Retail info
- MSRP: $199 USD

The Sigma 19mm F2.8 EX DN lens is a wide-angle prime lens for Sony E and Micro Four-Thirds mounts, announced by Sigma in January 2012. Along with the Sigma 30mm F2.8 EX DN, it was part of the first release of Sigma lenses for compact interchangeable lens cameras, and hence the inception of the "DN" line, created by Sigma to cater to these cameras, an offering that in January 2013 was expanded with another lens, the Sigma 60mm f/2.8 DN Art.

== Exterior ==
The lens has a matte black plastic exterior.

== Optics ==
The lens suffers from mild barrel distortion, moderate vignetting, and moderate amounts of chromatic aberration.

In general it is a sharp lens especially in the centre and when stopped down to f8 the edges will catch-up. Flare resistance is quite good. Bokeh is smooth and colour rendition is neutral.

== "Art" series version ==
On January 29, 2013, an aesthetically updated version of this lens was announced, the Sigma 19mm F2.8 DN Art. It has a glossy black (or silver) plastic exterior with the Sigma Art "A" badge on the side of the lens. It features a large manual focus ring and a detachable barrel-type lens hood.

The optics are identical to the older version.

== See also ==
- List of third-party E-mount lenses
- List of Micro Four Thirds lenses
