= Sigma 30mm F2.8 EX DN =

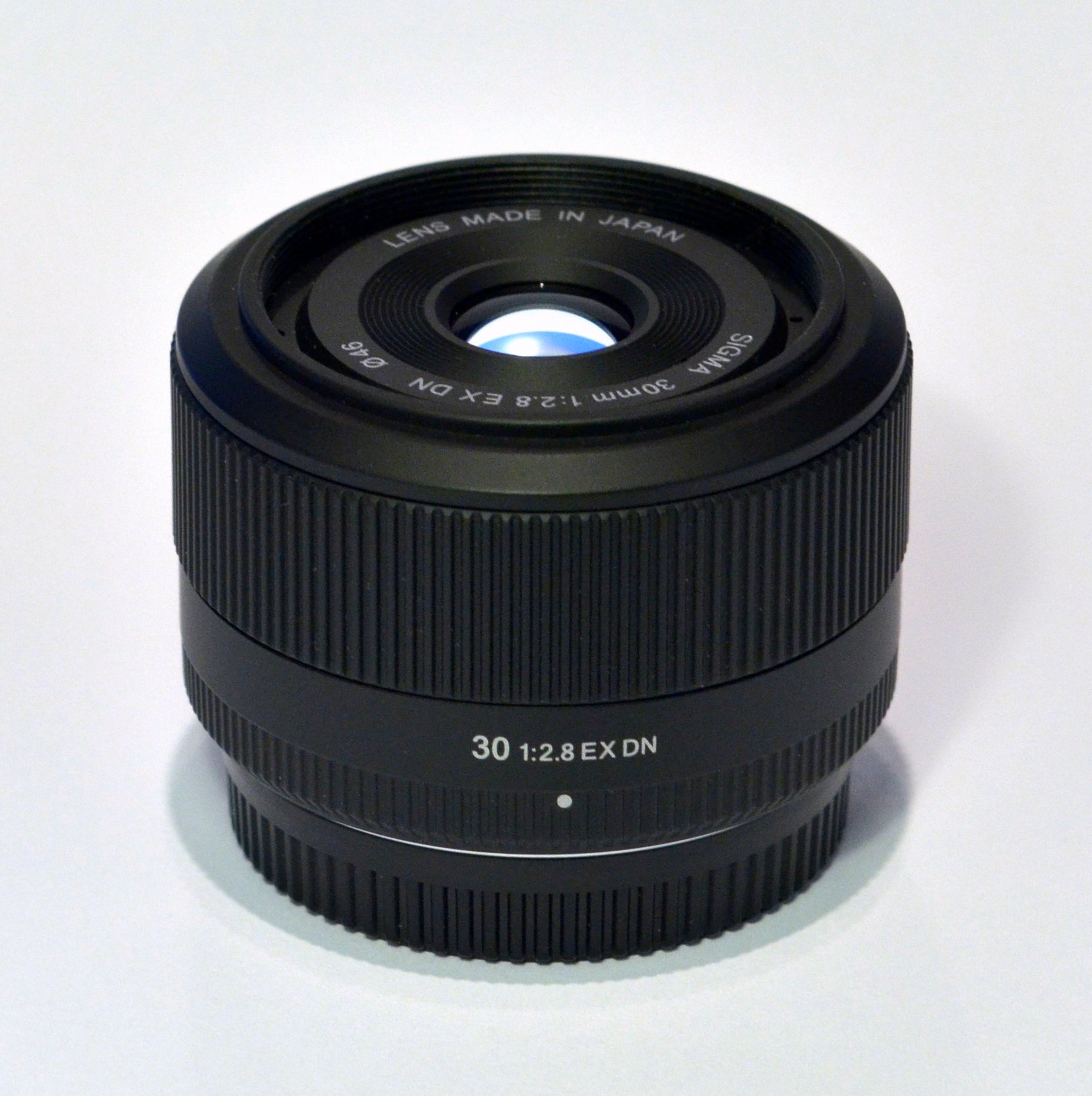
- Sigma 30mm F2.8 EX DN lens
- Maker: Sigma
- Lens mount(s): Sony E-mount, Micro Four Thirds

Technical data
- Type: Prime
- Focus drive: Micromotor
- Focal length: 30mm
- Focal length (35mm equiv.): 45mm
- Image format: APS-C
- Aperture (max/min): f/2.8 - 22.0
- Close focus distance: 0.30 metres (0.98 ft)
- Max. magnification: 0.12x
- Diaphragm blades: 7
- Construction: 7 elements in 5 groups

Features
- Manual focus override: Yes Yes
- Weather-sealing: No No
- Lens-based stabilization: No No
- Aperture ring: No No
- Application: Landscape, Street

Physical
- Max. length: 40.5 millimetres (1.59 in)
- Diameter: 60.8 millimetres (2.39 in)
- Weight: 140g
- Filter diameter: 46mm

Accessories
- Lens hood: LH520-03, Barrel-type
- Case: shipped with hardcase

History
- Introduction: 2012

Retail info
- MSRP: $199 USD

The Sigma 30mm F2.8 EX DN is a standard prime lens for Sony E and Micro Four-Thirds mounts, announced by Sigma in January 2012. Along with the Sigma 19mm F2.8 EX DN, it was part of the first release of Sigma lenses for compact interchangeable lens cameras, and hence the inception of the "DN" line, created by Sigma to cater to these cameras, an offering that in January 2013 was expanded with another lens, the Sigma 60mm f/2.8 DN Art.

== Construction ==
The lens has a matte black plastic exterior but features a metal mount.

== Image quality ==
Sharpness is already very high wide open and across the frame. Stopping down yields excellent resolution.

Chromatic aberration is well controlled as is vignetting. Distortion is barrel shaped on a low level.

One drawback is that this lens is slow (f/2.8) compared to other standard prime lenses which usually have a max aperture of f/1.4 - f/1.8. But its image quality, its small size and low weight makes this lens an ideal partner for APS-C and MFT cameras.

== "Art" series version ==
An aesthetically updated version, the Sigma 30mm F2.8 DN Art was announced by Sigma on January 29, 2013. It has a glossy black (or silver) plastic exterior with the Sigma Art "A" badge on the side of the lens. It features a large manual focus ring and a detachable barrel-type lens hood.

The optics are identical to the original version.

== See also ==
- List of third-party E-mount lenses
- List of Micro Four Thirds lenses
