= Tamron SP 35mm F1.8 Di VC USD =

- Maker: Tamron
- Lens mount(s): Canon EF, Nikon F (FX), Sony/Minolta Alpha

Technical data
- Type: Prime
- Focus drive: Ring-type ultrasonic
- Close focus distance: 0.20 metres (0.66 ft)
- Max. magnification: 0.4
- Diaphragm blades: 9
- Construction: 10 elements in 9 groups

Features
- Manual focus override: Yes Yes
- Weather-sealing: Yes Yes
- Lens-based stabilization: Yes Yes
- Aperture ring: No No

Physical
- Max. length: 81 millimetres (3.2 in)
- Diameter: 80 millimetres (3.1 in)
- Weight: 480 grams (1.06 lb)
- Filter diameter: 67mm

History
- Introduction: 2015

The Tamron SP 35mm F1.8 Di VC USD is an interchangeable moderate wide-angle prime lens for cameras with a full frame sensor or smaller. On an APS-C camera, it has a field of view similar to normal human vision. It was announced by Tamron on September 2, 2015.
