= Shenyang Zhongyi Mitakon Speedmaster 50 mm f/0.95 =

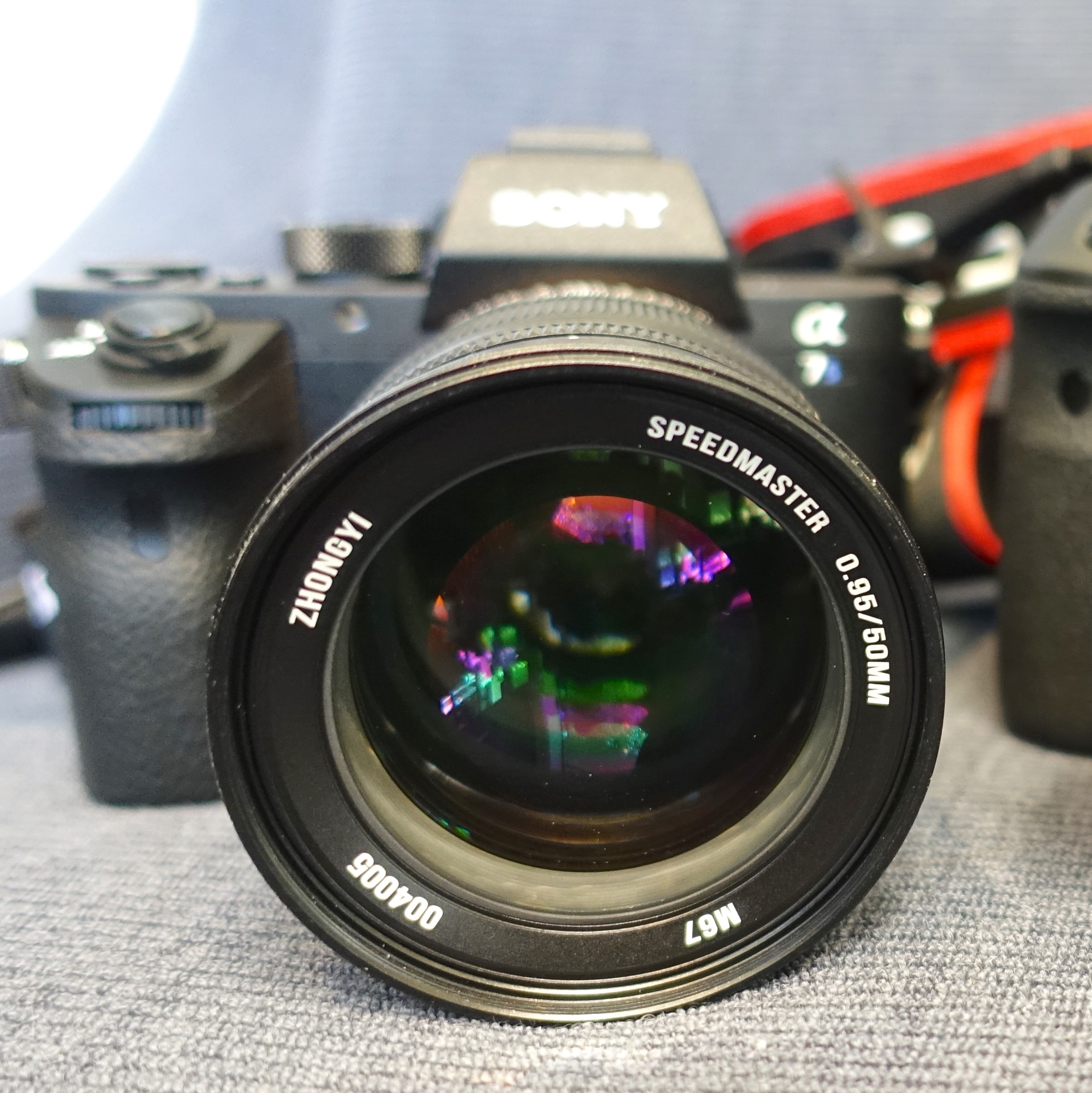
- Maker: Shenyang Zhongyi Mitakon
- Lens mount(s): Sony E-mount

Technical data
- Type: Prime
- Focus drive: manual focus
- Focal length: 50mm
- Image format: 35mm full-frame
- Aperture (max/min): f/0.95 - 16.0
- Close focus distance: 0.50 metres (1.6 ft)
- Max. magnification: 1:7 (0.12x)
- Diaphragm blades: 9
- Construction: 10 elements in 7 groups

Features
- Manual focus override: Yes Yes
- Weather-sealing: No No
- Lens-based stabilization: No No
- Aperture ring: Yes Yes
- Unique features: Maximum aperture less than f/1.0
- Application: Portrait, Low light

Physical
- Max. length: 87.0 millimetres (3.43 in)
- Diameter: 68.5 millimetres (2.70 in)
- Weight: 720 grams (1.59 lb)
- Filter diameter: 67mm

History
- Introduction: 2015

Retail info
- MSRP: $849 USD

The Shenyang Zhongyi Mitakon Speedmaster 50 mm f/0.95 lens is a standard manual focus prime lens for Sony E-mount, announced by Shenyang Zhongyi Mitakon on May 6, 2014.

Though designed for Sony's full frame E-mount cameras, the lens can be used on Sony's APS-C E-mount camera bodies, with an equivalent full-frame field-of-view of 75mm.

== Optical properties ==
The lens features an exceptionally fast maximum aperture of f/0.95, lending itself to creamy smooth bokeh and a narrow depth of view.

== See also ==
- List of third-party E-mount lenses
