= Sigma 30mm F1.4 DC DN =

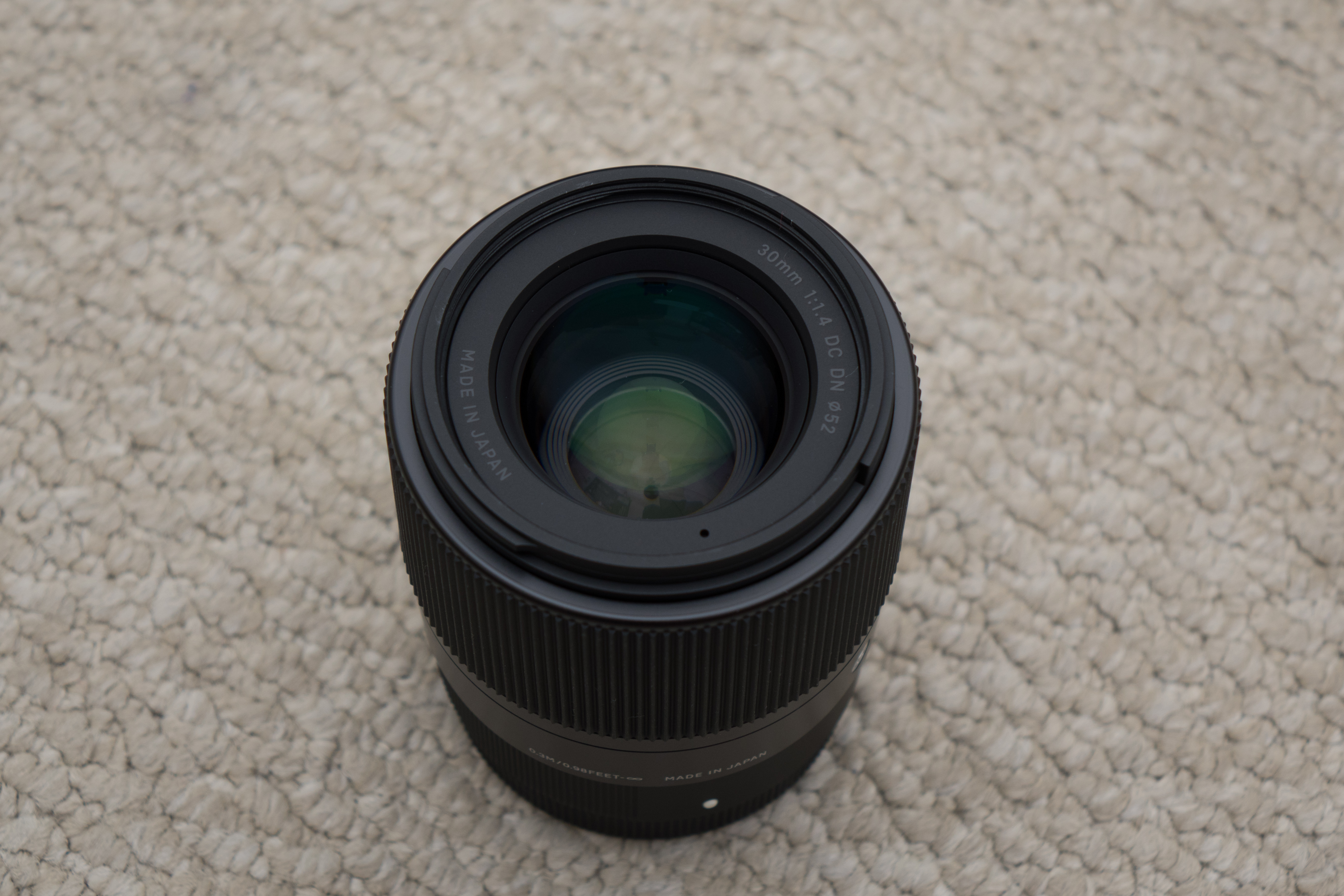
- Maker: Sigma
- Lens mounts: Canon EF-M, Canon RF, Leica L, Micro Four Thirds, Sony E

Technical data
- Type: Prime
- Focus drive: Stepper motor
- Focal length: 30mm
- Focal length (35mm equiv.): 45mm
- Image format: APS-C
- Aperture (max/min): f/1.4 - 16.0
- Close focus distance: 0.30 metres (0.98 ft)
- Max. magnification: 1:7 (0.14x)
- Diaphragm blades: 9
- Construction: 9 elements in 7 groups

Features
- Manual focus override: Yes Yes
- Weather-sealing: No No
- Lens-based stabilization: No No
- Aperture ring: No No
- Application: Multipurpose

Physical
- Max. length: 73.0 millimetres (2.87 in)
- Diameter: 65.0 millimetres (2.56 in)
- Weight: 264 grams (0.582 lb)
- Filter diameter: 52mm

Accessories
- Lens hood: Barrel-type

History
- Introduction: 2016

Retail info
- MSRP: $339 USD

The Sigma 30mm F1.4 DC DN Contemporary lens is a fixed maximum aperture standard prime lens for Sony E, Micro Four-Thirds, Canon EF-M, Canon RF-S and Leica L mounts, announced by Sigma in February 2016.

The lens is the mirrorless equivalent of the Sigma 30mm f/1.4 EX DC HSM, a similar lens of a different optical formula optimized for traditional mirror DSLRs.

== Build quality ==
The lens showcases a matte black plastic exterior with the Sigma Contemporary "C" badge on the side of the lens. It features a large manual focus ring and a detachable barrel-type lens hood. The lens is the updated version of the Sigma 30mm F2.8 Art lens, including autofocus and improving upon overall image quality, sharpness, and a faster maximum aperture.

== Image quality ==
The lens is exceptionally sharp, even when stopped down to its maximum aperture of f/1.4. The lens also excels in low-light photography given its fast maximum aperture of f/1.4, resulting in creamy smooth bokeh and thin depth‑of‑field.

The lens suffers from moderate barrel distortion and minor vignetting when at f/1.4 (which can be resolved by stopping down to f/2.8). Hints of chromatic aberration can be noted appearing in the corners of the frame when at f/1.4.

== See also ==
- List of third-party E-mount lenses
- List of Micro Four Thirds lenses
- Zeiss Touit Planar T* 1.8/32mm
