= Zeiss Batis Sonnar T* 2.8/135mm =

- Maker: Zeiss
- Lens mount: Sony E-mount

Technical data
- Type: Prime
- Focus drive: Linear motor
- Focal length: 135mm
- Image format: 35mm full-frame
- Aperture (max/min): f/2.8 - f/22.0
- Close focus distance: 0.87 metres (2.9 ft)
- Max. magnification: 0.19x
- Diaphragm blades: 9
- Construction: 14 elements in 11 groups

Features
- Manual focus override: Yes Yes
- Weather-sealing: Yes Yes
- Lens-based stabilization: Yes Yes
- Aperture ring: No No
- Unique features: Digital focus distance scale, 8 anomalous partial dispersion glass elements
- Application: Portrait

Physical
- Max. length: 120 millimetres (4.7 in)
- Diameter: 81 millimetres (3.2 in)
- Weight: 614 grams (1.354 lb)

History
- Introduction: 2017

Retail info
- MSRP: $1999 USD

The Zeiss Batis Sonnar T* 2.8/135mm is a full-frame (FE) telephoto prime lens for the Sony E-mount, announced by Zeiss on April 24, 2017.

Though designed for Sony's full frame E-mount cameras, the lens can be used on Sony's APS-C E-mount camera bodies, with an equivalent full-frame field-of-view of 202.5mm.

== Build quality ==
The lens features a minimalist weather resistant plastic construction with a matte black finish and a rubber focus ring. On the top of the lens is the OLED display that highlights the focus distance and depth of field range of the lens, which can be set to display at all times, never, or only when focusing manually.

== Optical quality ==
The Batis 135mm is sharp wide open, with consistent results across the frame. Chromatic aberration is "very low" at less than half a pixel wide open at the image edge. The lens has its sweet spot at around f/4. Vignetting is "far from severe", but there is some noticeable pincushion distortion that can be eliminated with in-camera correction or raw processing.

== Reception ==
Portrait photographer Bing Putney, writing an opinion for SLR Lounge ahead of having tested the lens, suggested that the Zeiss Batis Sonnar T* 2.8/135mm, given its introductory price, should be a stop faster to realistically compete with the Sony 70-200mm f/2.8 G Master or Sigma 135mm f/1.8 DG HSM Art, while also admitting that the Sigma lacks image stabilisation, which the Zeiss has, and requires an adapter to be used on Sony cameras.

== See also ==
- List of third-party E-mount lenses
- Zeiss Sonnar
