= Sigma 30mm f/1.4 EX DC HSM lens =

Photographic lens

Sigma 30mm f/1.4 EX DC HSM
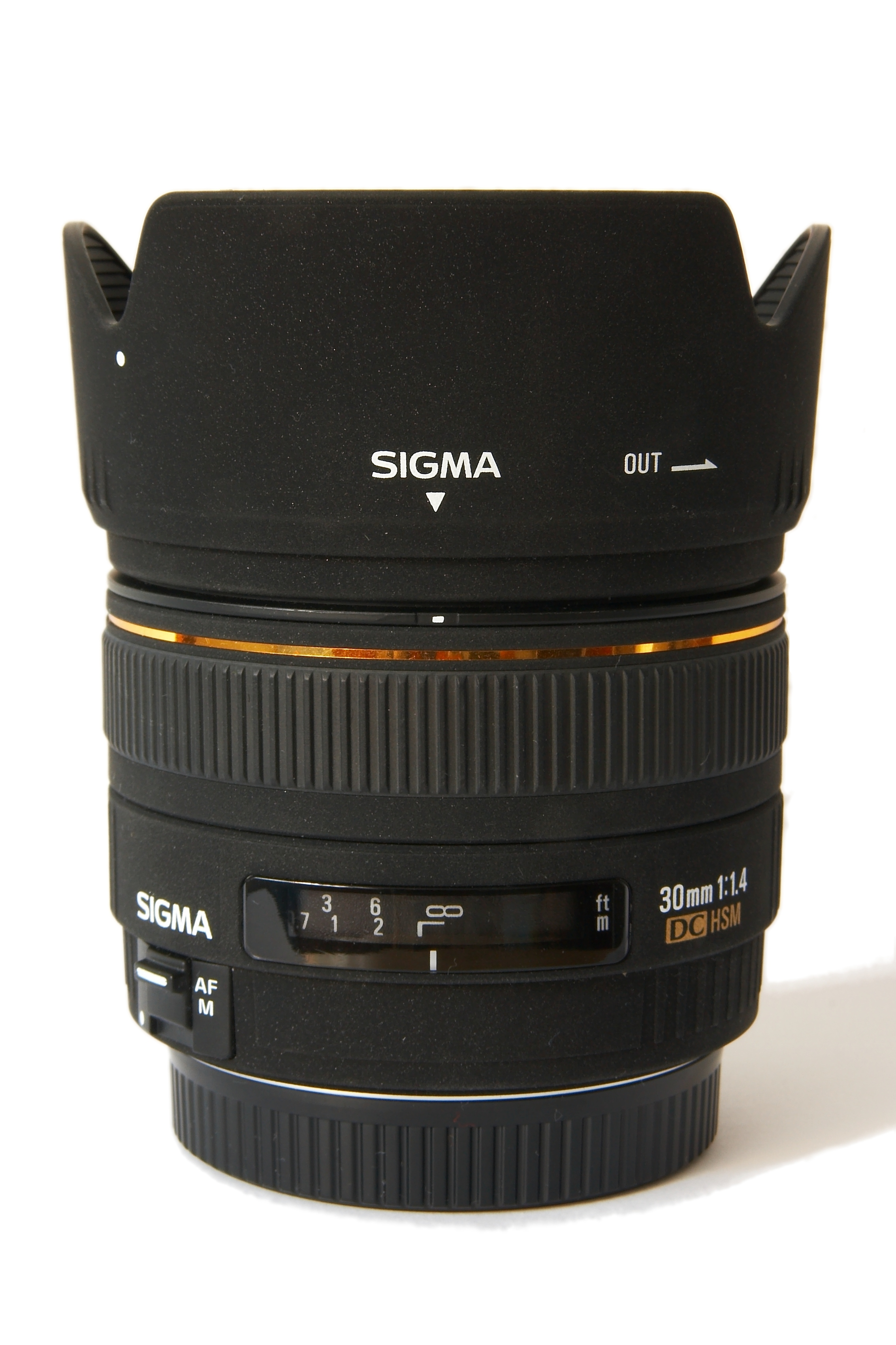
- Maker: Sigma Corporation

Technical data
- Focal length: 30 mm
- Aperture (max/min): f/1.4 - f/16
- Close focus distance: 40cm / 15.7in
- Max. magnification: 1:10.4
- Diaphragm blades: 8
- Construction: 7 elements in 7 groups

Features
- Short back focus: No No
- Ultrasonic motor: Yes Yes (not available with Pentax and Sony mount)
- Lens-based stabilization: No No
- Macro capable: No No
- Application: interiors/portrait

Physical
- Max. length: 59mm / 2.3in
- Diameter: 75.5mm / 2.9in
- Weight: 430g / 15.2oz.
- Filter diameter: 62mm

Accessories
- Lens hood: Petal Hood

Angle of view
- Horizontal: 43.6(1.5x), 41.1 (1.6x)
- Vertical: 29.9 (1.5x), 28.1 (1.6x)
- Diagonal: 51.4(1.5x), 48.5 (1.6x)

History
- Introduction: 2006

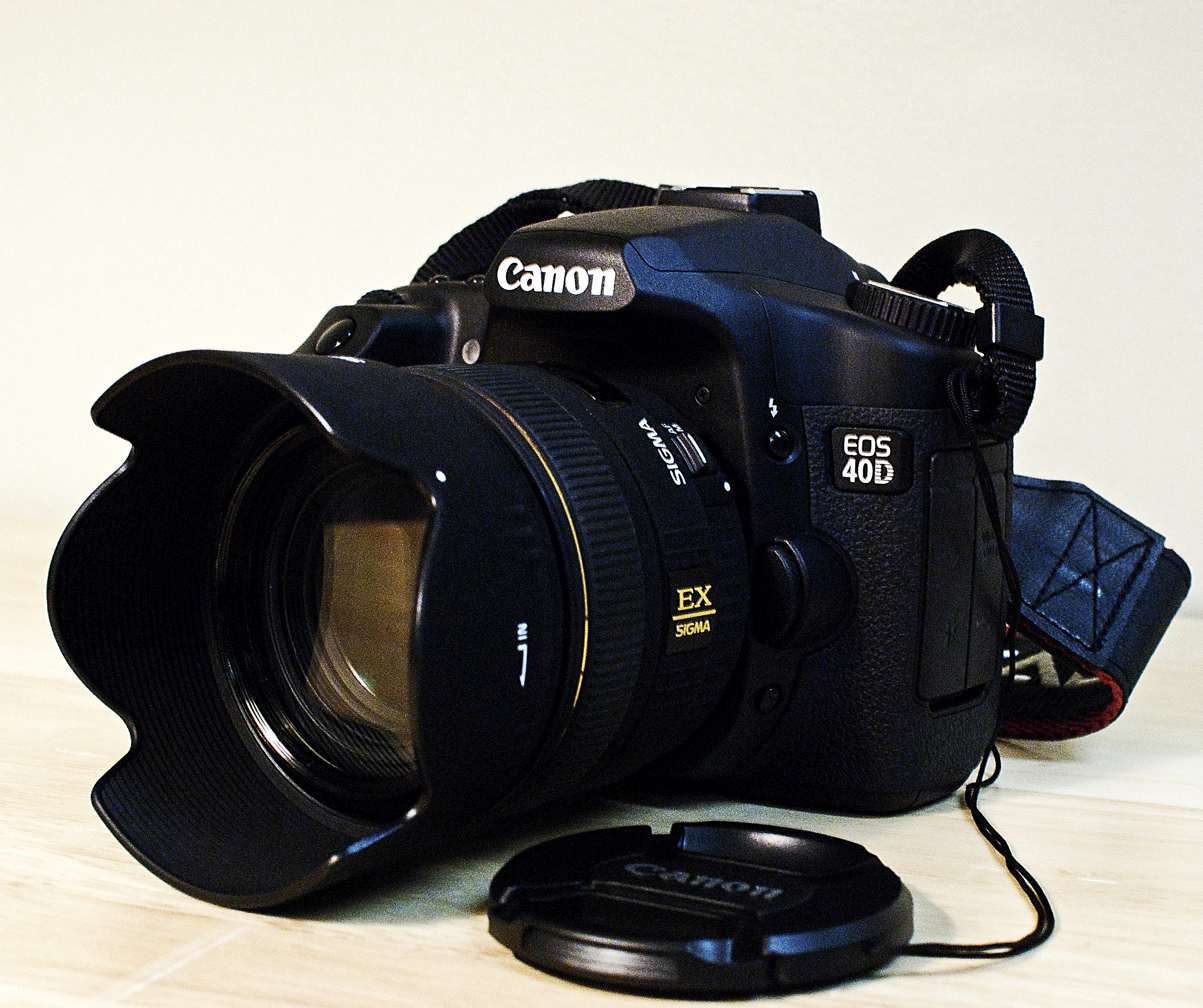
Sigma 30mm f/1.4 EX DC HSM mounted on a Canon EOS 40D, hood attached.

The Sigma 30mm f/1.4 EX DC HSM is a wide-aperture photographic lens made by the Sigma Corporation, equipped with a Hyper Sonic Motor (abbreviated HSM, Sigma's trade name for photo lens focusing technology using ultrasonic motor). The lens was produced in Canon EF mount, Four Thirds System, Nikon F-mount, Pentax K mount, the SA mount, and the Sony/Minolta AF Mount varieties, all of the same optical formula. It shipped with a removable petal-type lens hood (62mm diameter). The lens assumes a crop factor of roughly 1.5, and therefore the image circle will not cover the full frame if used on full-frame or 135 film cameras.

In 2013, Sigma announced that the lens would be replaced by a redesigned model designated as the Sigma 30mm f/1.4 DC HSM A; the new lens went on sale in March of that year in Canon, Nikon, and Sigma mounts.

Its large aperture allows for a shallow depth of field, allowing good isolation of close subjects. On APS-C sensor cameras, its field of view equivalent to that of a 46mm lens (Nikon DX, Pentax, Sony, current Sigma bodies), 48mm lens (Canon), 51mm lens (older Sigma bodies) or 60mm lens (Four Thirds). On the Four-Thirds mount, it is the only affordable normal, large aperture lens, therefore it is popular lens on that format.

== Known issues ==
The very heavy and large lens is connected to the camera via a ring-shaped, reinforced plastic casting and held in place by three tiny screws. A lateral load on the camera with the lens attached breaks the mount near one of the internal tiny screws. The optical axis becomes skewed (the image becomes blurry at one edge, while the image is clear in the center and at the other edge).

== Optical properties ==
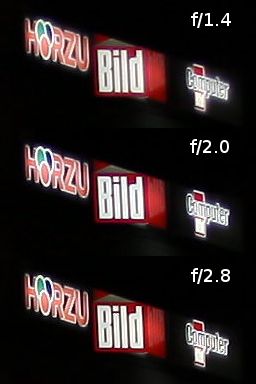
Center resolution

The Sigma 30mm f/1.4 EX DC HSM lens has unusual optical properties. With most photographic lenses, vignetting is drastically reduced by stopping down the aperture by about 1 f-stop. This lens has a more linear response to stopping down the aperture. To reduce vignetting by about one half, it is required to stop down the aperture by over 3 full f-stops. The optical resolution properties of this lens are also unique. Most lenses are typically sharp in the center of the image frame, and softer in the edges. This problem is typically solved by stopping down the lens. This lens has little response to such an effort. When stopped down by over 4 stops, the edges of the frame are still soft. However, the center resolution of the lens is high when used wide open, and becomes exceedingly high when the lens is stopped down.

== See also ==
- List of Nikon compatible lenses with integrated autofocus-motor
- Sigma 30mm F1.4 DC DN - lens of a different optical formula; optimized for Sony E-mount and Micro Four Thirds.

== References & External links ==
- Sigma 30mm F1.4 EX DC HSM page on the corporate website.
- Sigma 30mm F1.4 EX DC HSM image samples on pbase.com

Kind	Type	Focal length	Aperture	2000s							2010s							
Kind	Type	Focal length	Aperture	03	04	05	06	07	08	09	10	11	12	13	14	15	16	17
Prime	Fish-eye	8	3.5				Olympus Zuiko Digital 8mm F3.5											
Prime	Norm.	24	1.8				Sigma 24mm F1.8 EX DG											
Prime	Norm.	25	1.4					Leica D Summilux 25mm F1.4 ASPH										
Prime	Norm.	25	2.8						Olympus Zuiko Digital 25mm F2.8									
Prime	Norm.	30	1.4				Sigma 30mm F1.4 EX DC HSM											
Prime	Norm.	35	3.5			Olympus Zuiko Digital 35mm F3.5 Macro												
Prime	Tele	50	1.4						Sigma 50mm F1.4 EX DG HSM									
Prime	Tele	50	2.0	Olympus Zuiko Digital ED 50mm F2.0 Macro														
Prime	Tele	105	2.8				Sigma 105mm F2.8 EX DG Macro											
Prime	Tele	150	2.0							Olympus Zuiko Digital ED 150mm F2								
Prime	Tele	150	2.8				Sigma 150mm F2.8 EX DG APO Macro HSM											
Prime	Super tele	300	2.8		Olympus Zuiko Digital ED 300mm F2.8													
Zoom	UWA	7-14	4.0			Olympus Zuiko Digital ED 7-14mm F4												
Zoom	UWA	9-18	4–5.6						Olympus Zuiko Digital ED 9-18mm F4-5.6									
Zoom	UWA	10-20	4–5.6						Sigma 10-20mm F4.0-5.6 EX DC HSM									
Zoom	UWA	11-22	2.8–3.5		Olympus Zuiko Digital 11-22mm F2.8-3.5													
Zoom	Std.	12-60	2.8–4							Olympus Zuiko Digital ED 12-60mm F2.8-4 SWD								
Zoom	Std.	14-xx	2.0			Olympus Zuiko Digital ED 14-35mm f/2.0 SWD												
Zoom	Std.	14-xx	2.8-3.5	Olympus Zuiko Digital 14-54mm F2.8-3.5					Olympus Zuiko Digital 14-54mm F2.8-3.5 II									
Zoom	Std.	14-xx	2.8-3.5						Leica D Vario-Elmarit 14-50mm F2.8-3.5 ASPH									
Zoom	Std.	14-xx	3.5-5.6		Olympus Zuiko Digital 14-45mm F3.5-5.6													
Zoom	Std.	14-xx	3.5-5.6					Leica D Vario-Elmar 14-150mm F3.5-5.6 ASPH										
Zoom	Std.	14-xx	3.8-5.6				Leica D Vario-Elmar 14-50mm F3.8-5.6 ASPH											
Zoom	Std.	17,5-45	3.5-5.6			Olympus Zuiko Digital 17.5-45mm F3.5-5.6												
Zoom	Std.	18-50	2.8				Sigma 18-50mm F2.8 EX DC											
Zoom	Std.	18-50	3.5-5.6		Sigma 18-50mm F3.5-5.6 DC													
Zoom	Std.	18-125	3.5-5.6				Sigma 18-125mm F3.5-5.6 DC											
Zoom	Std.	18-180	3.5–6.3				Olympus Zuiko Digital ED 18-180mm F3.5-6.3											
Zoom	Tele	35-100	2.0			Olympus Zuiko Digital ED 35-100mm F2												
Zoom	Tele	50-500	4.0-6.3							Sigma 50-500mm F4-6.3 EX DG HSM								
Zoom	Tele	5x-200	2.8-3.5	Olympus Zuiko Digital ED 50-200mm f/2.8-3.5				Olympus Zuiko Digital ED 50-200mm F2.8-3.5 SWD										
Zoom	Tele	5x-200	4-5.6						Sigma 55-200mm F4-5.6 DC									
Zoom	Tele	70-200	2.8							Sigma 70-200mm F2.8 EX DG Macro II HSM								
Zoom	Tele	70-300	4-5.6					Olympus Zuiko Digital ED 70-300mm F4-5.6										
Zoom	Tele	40-150	3.5-4.5		Olympus Zuiko Digital 40-150mm F3.5-4.5													
Zoom	Tele	40-150	4-5.6				Olympus Zuiko Digital ED 40-150mm F4-5.6											
Zoom	Super Tele	90-250	2.8			Olympus Zuiko Digital ED 90-250mm F2.8												
Zoom	Super Tele	135-400	4.5-5.6					Sigma 135-400mm F4.5-5.6 DG APO										
Zoom	Super Tele	300-800	5.6					Sigma 300-800mm F5.6 EX DG HSM APO										
Teleconverter					Olympus Zuiko Digital 1.4x Teleconverter EC-14													
Teleconverter					Olympus Zuiko Digital 2x Teleconverter EC-20													
Extension tube					Olympus Extension Tube EX-25													
Kind	Type	Focal length	Aperture	03	04	05	06	07	08	09	10	11	12	13	14	15	16	17
Kind	Type	Focal length	Aperture	2000s							2010s							
