= Tamron 150-500mm F5-6.7 Di III VC VXD =

Tamron 150-500mm F5-6.7 Di III VC VXD (A057)
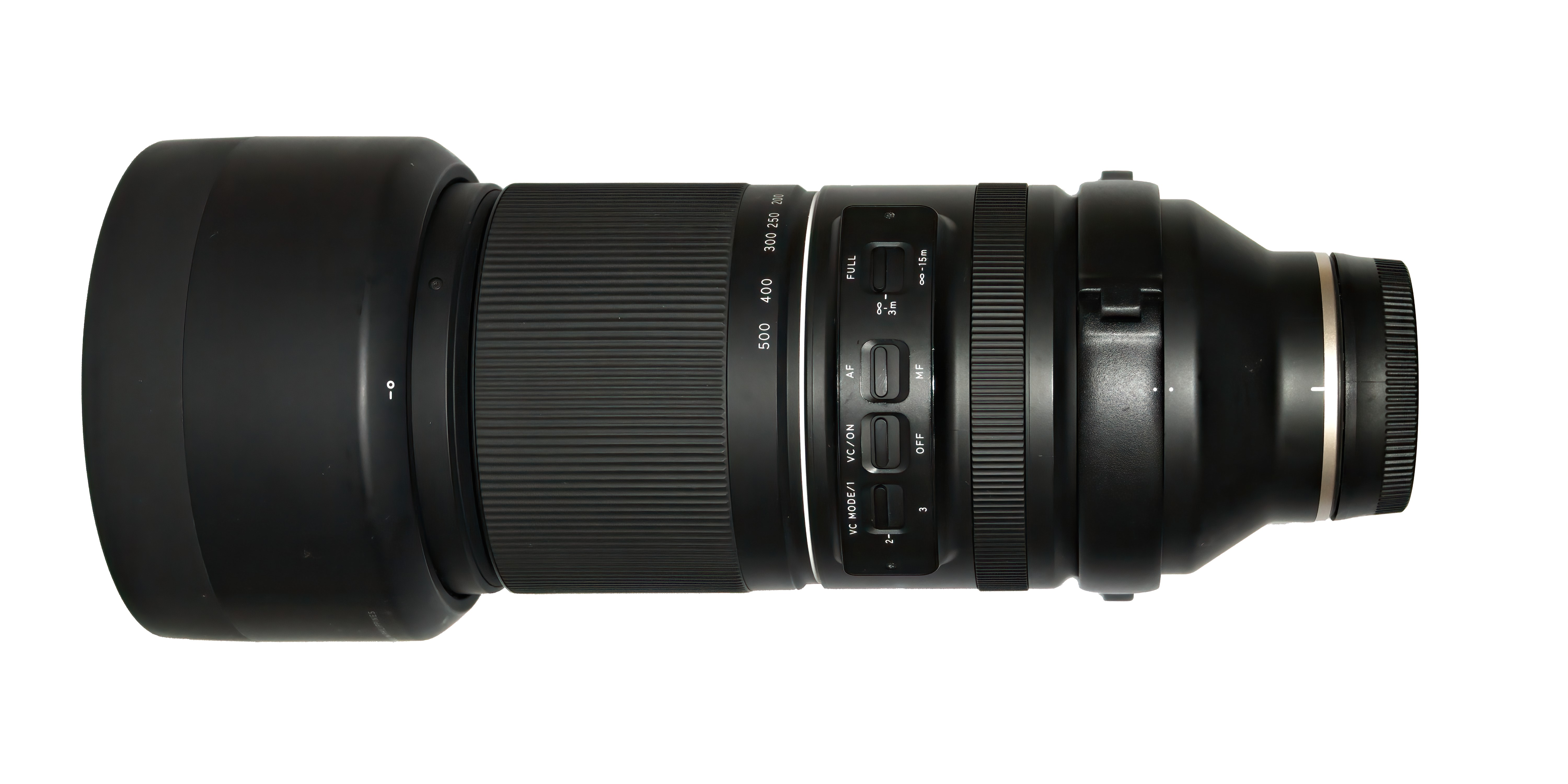
- Maker: Tamron

Technical data
- Type: Super-telephoto zoom lens
- Focal length: 150-500mm
- Aperture (max/min): f/5-f/22@150mm f/6.7-f/32@500mm
- Close focus distance: 0.6m@150mm 1.8m@500mm
- Max. magnification: 1:3.1@150mm 1:3.7@500mm
- Diaphragm blades: 7
- Construction: 25 elements in 16 groups

Features
- Ultrasonic motor: Yes
- Lens-based stabilization: Yes
- Macro capable: Yes
- Application: Sports, Wildlife, Landscape

Physical
- Max. length: 209.6mm
- Diameter: φ93mm
- Weight: without tripod 1,725g tripod 155g
- Filter diameter: φ82mm

Accessories
- Lens hood: HA057

Angle of view
- Diagonal: 16°25'-4°57'

History
- Introduction: 2021

Tamron 150-500mm F5-6.7 Di III VC VXD (A057) is a super-telephoto zoom lens designed and produced by Tamron for Sony E-mount full-frame cameras. It provides an equivalent focal length of 225-750mm when used on APS-C cameras. The lens was announced on April 22, 2021 and released on June 10.
