= Zeiss Batis Distagon T* 2.8/18mm =

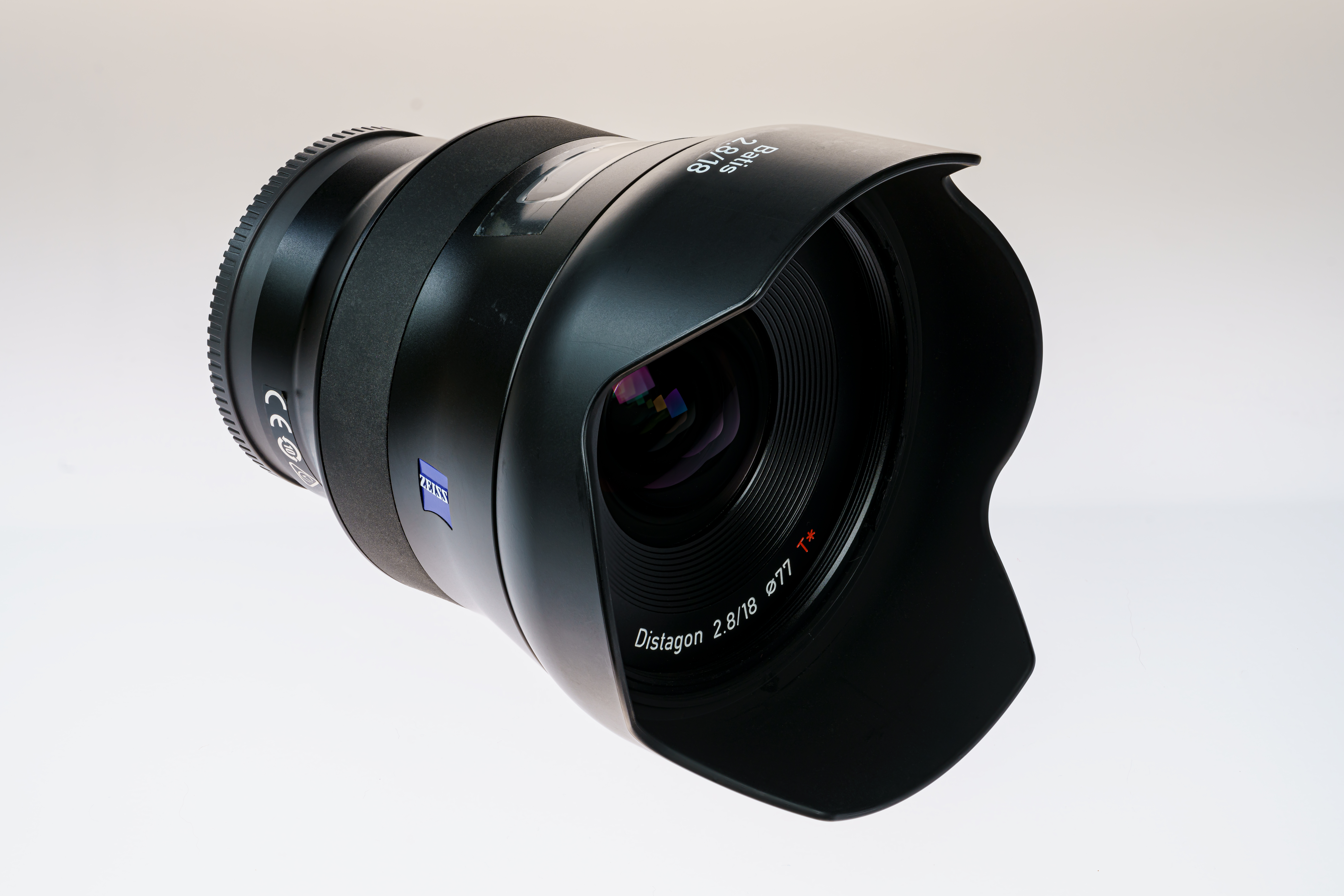
- Maker: Zeiss
- Lens mount(s): Sony E-mount

Technical data
- Type: Prime
- Focus drive: Linear motor
- Focal length: 18mm
- Image format: 35mm full-frame
- Aperture (max/min): f/2.8 - f/22.0
- Close focus distance: 0.25 metres (0.82 ft)
- Max. magnification: 0.11x
- Diaphragm blades: 9
- Construction: 11 elements in 10 groups

Features
- Manual focus override: Yes Yes
- Weather-sealing: Yes Yes
- Lens-based stabilization: No No
- Aperture ring: No No
- Unique features: Digital focus distance scale
- Application: Landscape, Architectural

Physical
- Max. length: 80 millimetres (3.1 in)
- Diameter: 78 millimetres (3.1 in)
- Weight: 330 grams (0.73 lb)

History
- Introduction: 2016

Retail info
- MSRP: $1499 USD

The Zeiss Batis Distagon T* 2.8/18mm is a full-frame (FE) wide-angle prime lens for the Sony E-mount, announced by Zeiss on April 14, 2016.

Though designed for Sony's full frame E-mount cameras, the lens can be used on Sony's APS-C E-mount camera bodies, with an equivalent full-frame field-of-view of 27mm.

== Build quality ==
The lens features a minimalist weather resistant plastic construction with a matte black finish and a rubber focus ring. On the top of the lens is the OLED display that highlights the focus distance and depth of field range of the lens, which can be set to display at all times, never, or only when focusing manually.

== See also ==
- List of third-party E-mount lenses
- Zeiss Distagon
