= Zeiss Touit 2.8/12 =

Camera lens

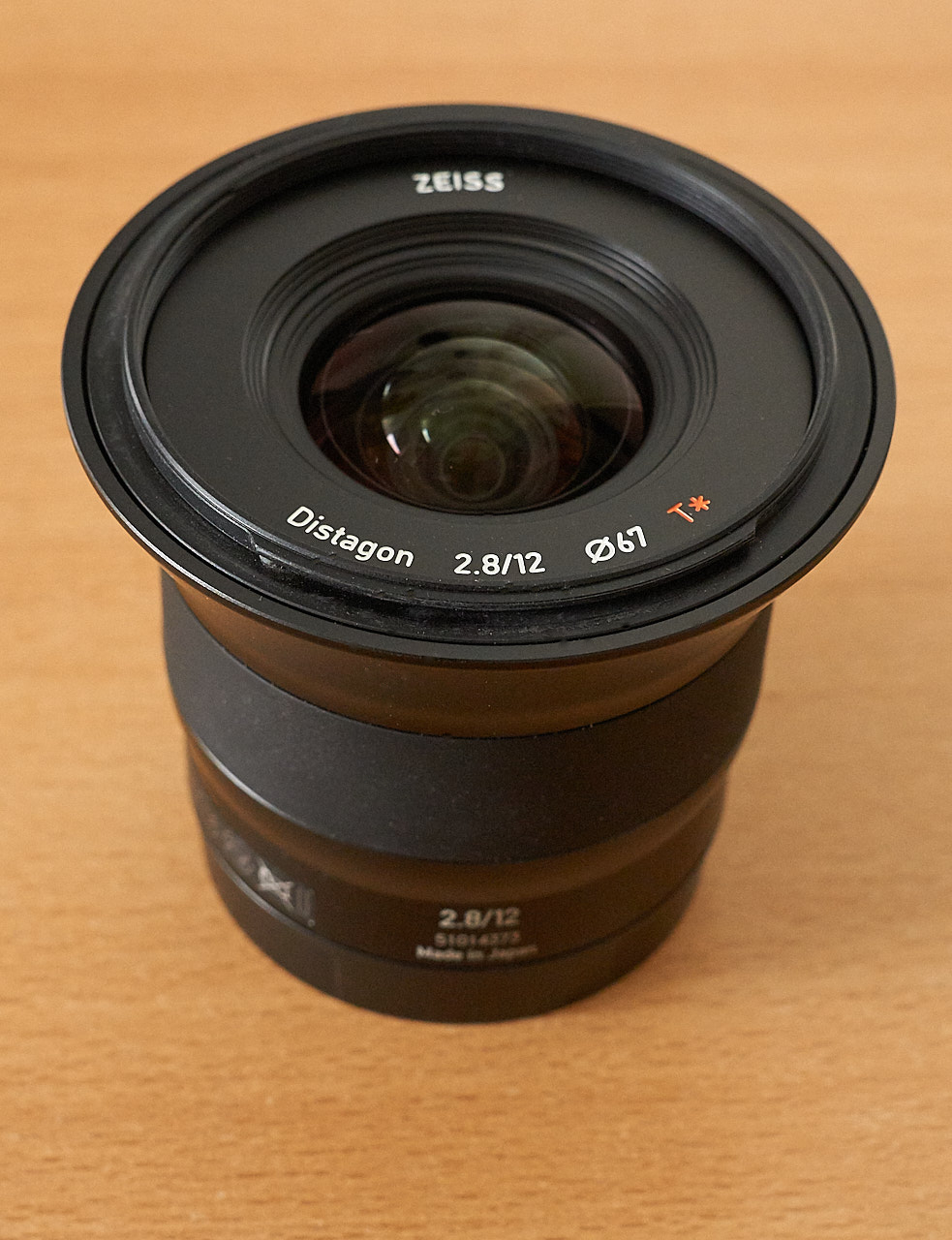
- Zeiss Touit 12mm 2.8
- Maker: Zeiss
- Lens mounts: Fujifilm X-mount, Sony E-mount

Technical data
- Type: Prime
- Focal length: 12mm
- Focal length (35mm equiv.): 18mm
- Image format: APS-C
- Aperture (max/min): f/2.8-22
- Close focus distance: 0.18 metres (0.59 ft)
- Max. magnification: 0.11
- Diaphragm blades: 9
- Construction: 11 elements in 8 groups

Features
- Manual focus override: Yes Yes
- Weather-sealing: No No
- Lens-based stabilization: No No
- Aperture ring: Only in X-mount
- Application: landscape, architecture, interior

Physical
- Max. length: 86 millimetres (3.4 in)
- Diameter: 82 millimetres (3.2 in)
- Weight: 270 grams (0.60 lb)
- Filter diameter: 67mm

Accessories
- Lens hood: plastic, bayonet, petal-shaped

Angle of view
- Horizontal: 89°
- Vertical: 66°
- Diagonal: 99°

History
- Introduction: 2012

The Zeiss Touit 2.8/12 is an interchangeable APS-C wide-angle camera lens announced by Zeiss on September 18, 2012. Zeiss used a diagnostic optical design for this lens.

== See also ==
- List of third-party E-mount lenses
- Fujifilm X-mount Lenses
