= Sigma 60mm F2.8 DN Art =

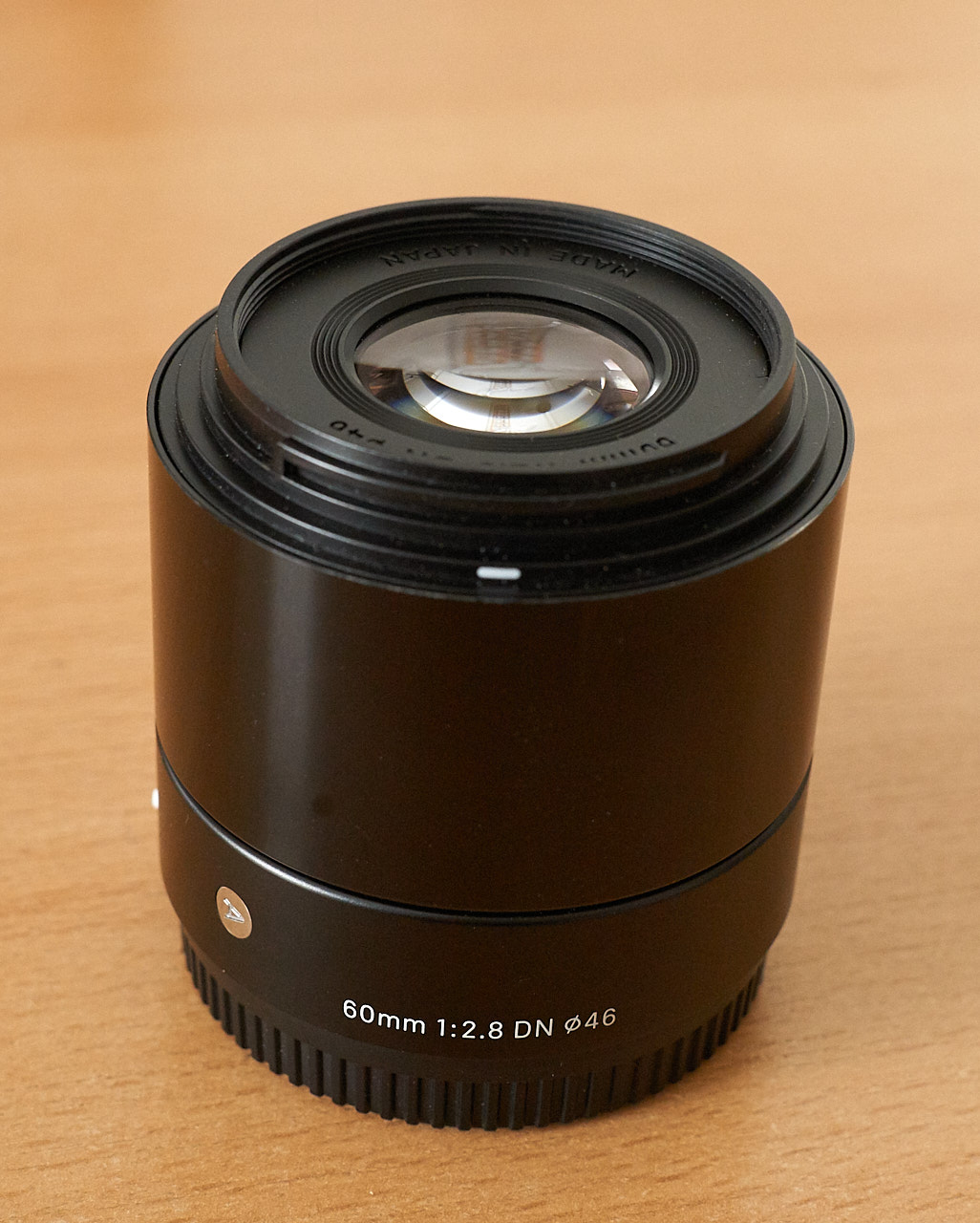
- Maker: Sigma
- Lens mount(s): Sony E-mount, Micro Four Thirds

Technical data
- Type: Prime
- Focus drive: Micromotor
- Focal length: 60mm
- Focal length (35mm equiv.): 90mm
- Image format: APS-C
- Aperture (max/min): f/2.8 - 22.0
- Close focus distance: 0.50 metres (1.6 ft)
- Max. magnification: 0.14x
- Diaphragm blades: 7
- Construction: 8 elements in 6 groups

Features
- Manual focus override: Yes Yes
- Weather-sealing: No No
- Lens-based stabilization: No No
- Aperture ring: No No
- Application: Landscape, Street, Portrait

Physical
- Max. length: 55.5 millimetres (2.19 in)
- Diameter: 60.8 millimetres (2.39 in)
- Weight: 190 grams (0.42 lb)
- Filter diameter: 46mm

Accessories
- Lens hood: LH520-03, Barrel-type
- Case: ships in a hard case

History
- Introduction: 2013
- Discontinuation: 2019

Retail info
- MSRP: $239 USD

Sigma 60mm F2.8 DN Art lens is a standard prime lens for Sony E and Micro Four-Thirds mounts, announced by Sigma on January 29, 2013. It was only the third interchangeable lens brought to market by Sigma for a digital mirrorless camera, and the second time doing so (the first two lenses were released together in January 2012).

== Build quality ==
The lens showcases a glossy black (or silver) plastic exterior with the Sigma Art "A" badge on the side of the lens. It features a large manual focus ring and a detachable barrel-type lens hood.

== Image quality ==
The optics are exceptionally sharp across the frame from its maximum aperture of f/2.8. It has very little distortion, chromatic aberration, or vignetting.

Colour rendition is very good and neutral. Also it has a good resistance to lens flare.

== See also ==
- List of third-party E-mount lenses
- List of Micro Four Thirds lenses
