= Tamron =

Japanese optics company

Tamron Co., Ltd.
- Native name: 株式会社タムロン
- Romanized name: Kabushiki-gaisha Tamuron
- Type: Kabushiki Kaisha
- Traded as: TYO: 7740
- Industry: Imaging
- Founded: Saitama, Japan (November 1, 1950)
- Headquarters: Saitama, Japan, Japan
- Area served: Worldwide
- Key people: Shogo Sakuraba, President & CEO
- Products: Photographic lenses, optical components for cameras, commercial/industrial use optics
- Revenue: ▲63,285 million Yen (FY2019)
- Number of employees: 4,640 (as of December 31, 2017)
- Website: www.tamron.co.jp/en

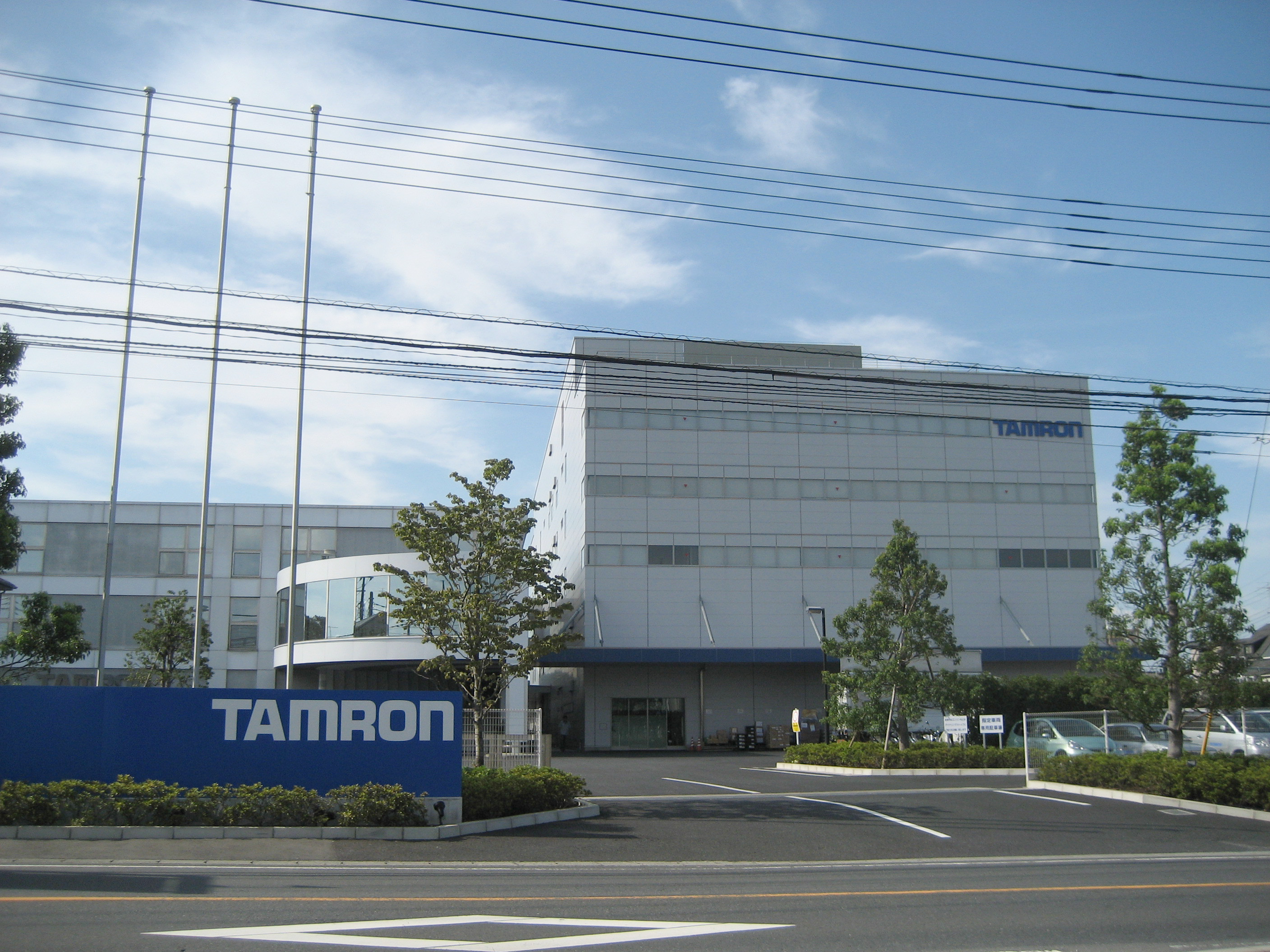
Tamron head office in Minuma-ku, Saitama, Japan

Tamron Co., Ltd. (株式会社タムロン, Kabushiki-gaisha Tamuron) is a Japanese company manufacturing photographic lenses, optical components and commercial/industrial-use optics. Tamron Headquarters is located in Saitama City in the Saitama Prefecture of Japan.

The name of the company came from the surname of Uhyoue Tamura who was instrumental in developing Tamron's optical technologies. It was only on the company's 20th anniversary that the name was changed to Tamron (from Taisei Optical).

In the fiscal year ending 31 December 2017, net sales totaled 60.496 billion yen and operating income was 4.24 billion yen, up 79.8% from 2016. At that time, the consolidated company had 4,640 employees and five production plants: in Hirosaki, Namioka and Owani in Japan, and one in China and Viet Nam, respectively. Subsidiary companies were located in the U.S., Germany, France, Hong Kong, Shanghai, Moscow and Haryana, India. Sony is a major shareholder in the company, with a 15.02% stake as of 2024.

== History ==
The Taisei Optical Manufacturing Company founded in 1950 November to manufacture lenses for cameras and binoculars. Taisei Optical Industries was established in 1952 October with a capital of 2.5 million yen. The ‘Tamron’ trademark registered in 1958. The Trade name was changed to Tamron Co., Ltd in April of 1970. Tamron Industries, Inc. (presently Tamron USA, Inc.) was established in New York City in April of 1979.

- 1982 September – Tamron Vertriebs GmbH established in Germany.
- 1984 February – Optech Tamron Co., Ltd. is established in Namioka, Aomori Prefecture.
- 1984 August – Shares listed with Japan Securities Dealers Association (currently JASDAQ) in Tokyo for over-the-counter transactions.
- 1985 December – Tamron Fine Giken Co., Ltd., a plant for making precision metal molds is established.
- 1986 January – Injection molding plant is established in Owani, Aomori.
- 1991 June – Optech Tamron Co., Ltd., is absorbed by Tamron Co., Ltd.
- 1995 February – Tamron acquires 75% capital of Bronica Co., Ltd., entering into the medium-format camera business
- 1995 April – Tamron (UK) Ltd. is established in the U.K.
- 1997 May – Tamron Industries (Hong Kong) is established in Hong Kong.
- 1997 July – Tamron Optical (Foshan) Co., Ltd. is established in Foshan, Guangdong, People’s Republic of China.
- 1998 July – Bronica Co., Ltd. is merged into Tamron Co., Ltd.
- 2000 June – Tamron Fine Giken is merged into Tamron Co., Ltd.
- 2000 June – Tamron France EURL is established in France.
- 2005 October – Tamron Optical (Shanghai) Co., Ltd. is established in Shanghai, People’s Republic of China.
- 2006 November – Tamron listed on the 1st Section of the Tokyo Stock Exchange.
- 2008 May – Tamron Co., Ltd. Taiwan manufacturing factory opened in Tainan, Taiwan.
- 2009 July – Tamron Co., Ltd. India Liaison Office opened in Haryana, India.
- 2009 November – Tamron Europe GmbH. Moscow Representative Office opened in Moscow, Russia.
- 2013 June – Tamron India Pvt Ltd.opened in Haryana, India.
- 2016 – Sale of compact camera lens modules began.
- 2017 – Sale of drone camera lens modules began and Tamron acquired Toumeigiken Co.
- 2026 July – Sony made a non-binding proposal to acquire the remaining shares of Tamron and make the company a wholly owned Sony Group subsidiary. Tamron established a special committee of independent directors to evaluate the proposal; financial terms were not disclosed.

== Products ==
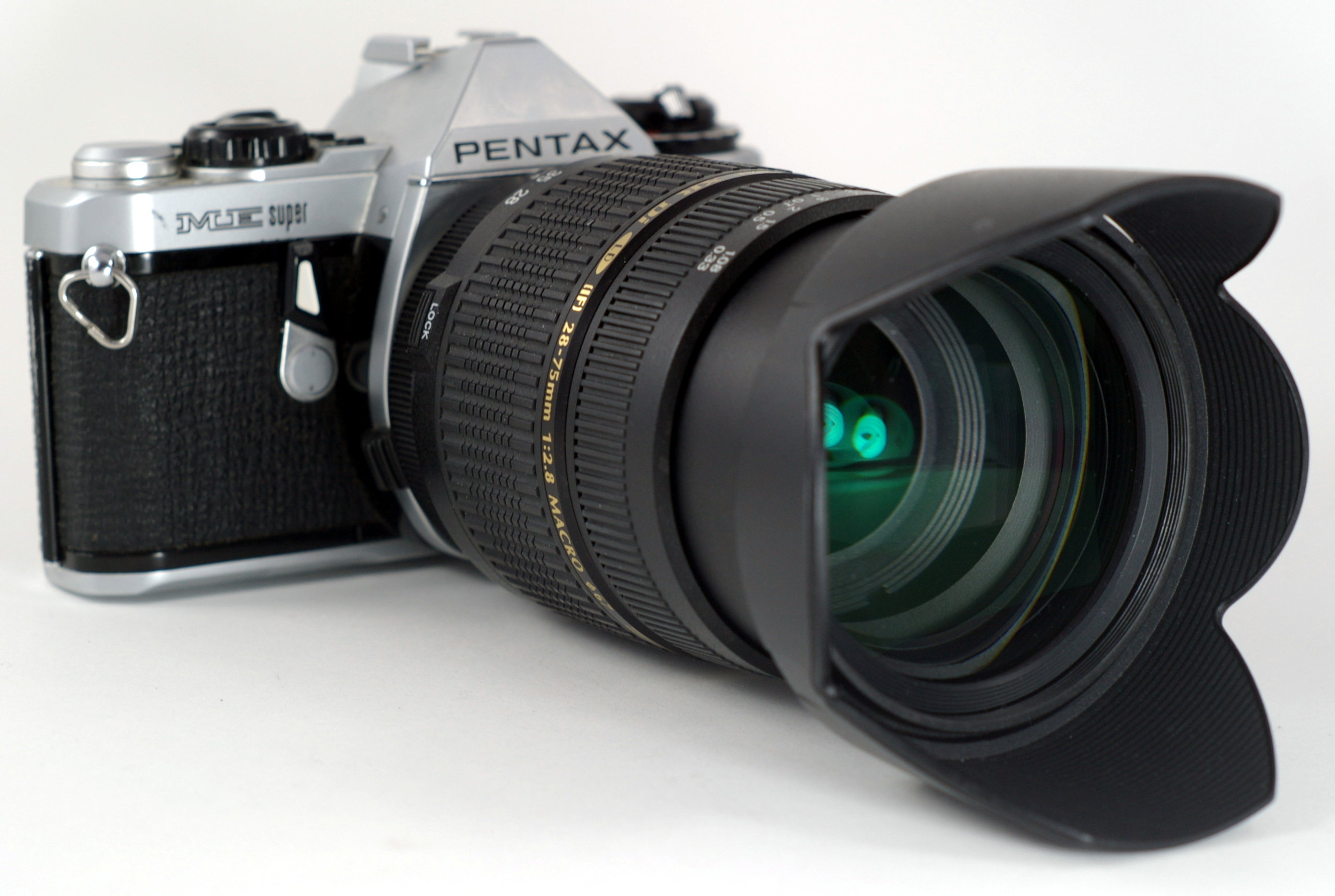
The Tamron SP AF 28–75 mm f/2.8 XR Di LD Aspherical [IF] Macro (model A09), a full-frame constant aperture lens mounted on a film camera.

Tamron had sold more than 5 million lenses as of September 2014. In the 2017 fiscal year, such lenses accounted for 74.9% of all sales.

Tamron's products included photographic lenses including interchangeable lenses for digital and conventional SLR cameras, fixed-focal wideangle, telephoto and macro lenses, zoom lenses of various focal length ranges, and teleconverters.

They also manufacture optical components including camcorder lenses, digital still camera lenses, and cellular phone camera lenses.

For commercial and industrial-use they produce optics including CCTV camera lenses (for surveillance, industrial vision, and image-processing) and projection lenses, test plates, high precision molds, injection-molded parts & components, optical device units.

== See also ==
- List of Tamron lenses with Nikon F-mount and integrated autofocus motor
