= List of Nikon F-mount lenses with integrated autofocus motor =

The following list of Nikon F-mount lenses with integrated autofocus motor includes only Nikon F-mount lenses which fully autofocus in all modes of all Nikon F-mount digital single-lens reflex cameras with and also without an autofocus motor. Cameras lacking an integrated autofocus motor (often called screw drive) are the Nikon D40, D40X, D60, Nikon D3xxx series (the latest model of which is the D3500), Nikon D5xxx series (the latest model of which is the D5600), all Nikon 1 series cameras with FT1 adapter and the Nikon Z-mount cameras with FTZ adapter. Clearly designated including the necessary autofocus motor are all Nikon Nikkor AF-S (introduced 1996), AF-P (introduced 2015, not compatible with older bodies like the D3200) and the older AF-I (introduced 1992) lenses. Other manufacturers have different or no designations for lenses including a focus motor. All here not listed AF lenses without an autofocus motor do work fully, but lack autofocus-function on these cameras. Instead an electronic rangefinder can be used to find focus.

Additionally all lenses in this list from Nikon and other manufacturers do integrate a CPU (microprocessor, introduced 1986) and additionally electronically communicate the focus distance information ('D' function, introduced 1992). Therefore, all lenses in this list support all Nikon DSLRs with all camera's exposure and Through-the-lens (TTL) metering modes including Matrix Metering mode, and also flash autoexposure like 3D (Color) Matrix Metering, D-TTL and the newer I-TTL also with Creative Lighting System (CLS).

Besides the quality (autofocus speed and noise, optical aberrations and other) of the lens including the way this quality is achieved (used technologies like type of autofocus motor, lens and body design and others), the main functional differences of the lenses in this list are the integration of optical image stabilization ('VR', introduced 2000) and secondly if it fully illuminates a Nikon FX (full-frame, 35mm) image sensor format and smaller sizes or if the specified maximum lens illumination is limited to the Nikon DX format with 1.5x crop factor (by default Nikon FX cameras crop the image automatically).

In June 2017, the list is supposed to be complete including 201 past and present lenses, additionally 28 compatible teleconverters and three lens extension tubes with support for integrated autofocus-motors. Listed here are nearly all recent autofocus-lenses, because all manufacturers have included focus motors in their Nikon-compatible lenses for years. The lenses are ordered by manufacturer and minimum and maximum focal length.

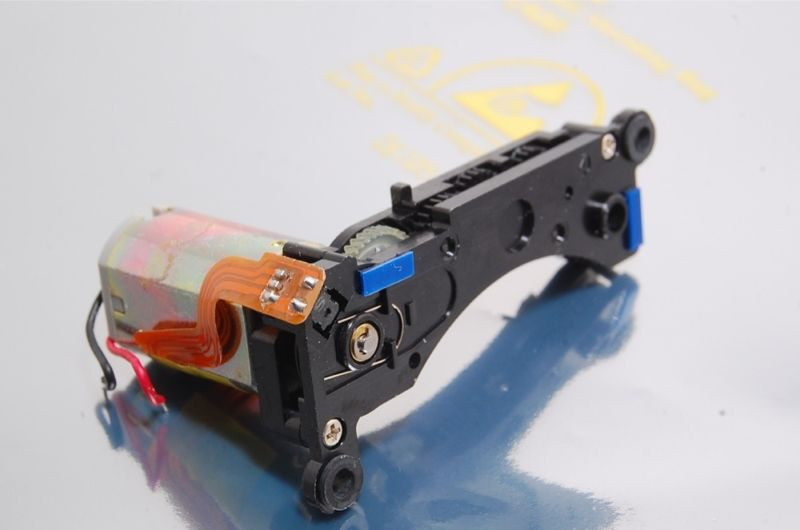
The Autofocus (AF) drive motor (Nikon D70/D70S) which is needed to drive older AF lenses without integrated motor. It is controlled by a coprocessor of the Expeed.

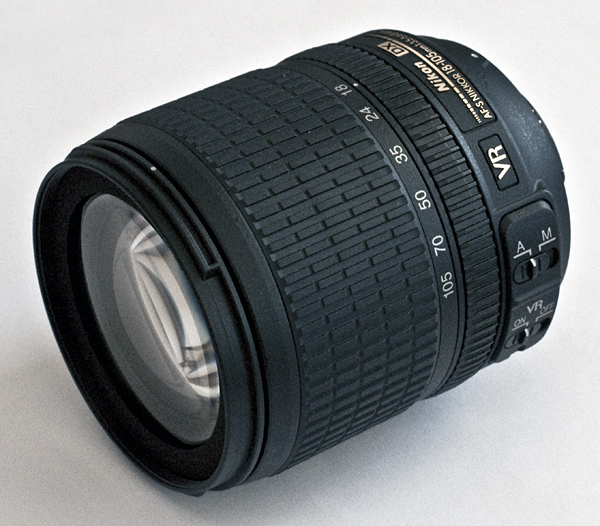
Nikon NIKKOR AF-S DX 18-105mm f3.5-5.6G ED VR lens for Nikon F-mount

== Nomenclature ==
The sequence of lens designations may differ in literature. See also full list of Nikon designations, Sigma designations, Tamron designations and Tokina designations.

- Nikon AF-S/Sigma HSM/Tamron USD or PZD: The lens contains an integrated ultrasonic focus motor based on piezoelectricity, which enables quiet or low noise autofocus operation. All Nikon zoom AF-lenses have focal length encoders added.
- Nikon AF-P: The lens contains a pulse motor (utilizing stepping motors) to focus smoother and quieter than previous drive systems.
- Nikon AF-I, Sigma/Tamron/Tokina: no designation: The lens contains an integrated focus electric motor. The Nikon type was produced from 1992 to 1996 and is rarely seen.
- Nikon DX/Sigma DC/Tamron Di II/Tokina DX: Denotes a lens that is designed for APS-C DSLR sensors. Use of this lens on a full-frame (FX) sensor will likely cause vignetting. All full-frame Nikon DSLRs are able to detect DX lenses and crop the image accordingly by default. However, the viewfinder view is likely to be constricted.
- Sigma DG/Tamron Di/Tokina FX: A lens for fullframe DSLRs (FX) or analog film. No special designation for Nikon NIKKOR. All fullframe lenses can be fully used on DX DSLRs with the advantage of reduced vignetting.
- Nikon VR/Sigma OS/Tamron VC/Tokina VCM: Optical image stabilization, Nikon designation 'Vibration Reduction', indicated by green background, a system used to compensate for vibration and other camera movement.
- Nikon D, Sigma/Tamron/Tokina: no designation: The lens is fitted with a CPU and additionally a digital sensor that tells the camera the distance at which it is focused, to allow for better exposure calculation. Although some Nikon DSLRs will not do any exposure metering at all without a 'CPU' lens, all lenses in this list from Nikon and other manufacturers support compatible CPU and 'D' function.
- Nikon G, Sigma/Tamron/Tokina: no designation: The lens is not fitted with an aperture ring, and is thus incompatible with most old Nikon film SLR bodies. All G-type lenses are also D-type.
- All IF: The lens utilises an internal focus mechanism, which does not extend or rotate the front optical element.
- Nikon ED/Sigma APO/Tamron (X)LD/Tokina SD: Indicates that the lens is fitted with Extra-Low Dispersion glass, which aids in reducing chromatic aberration and flare.
- ^{†} : Lens is out of production. It is either not available as new or is extremely rarely available as new.

== Nikon lenses ==
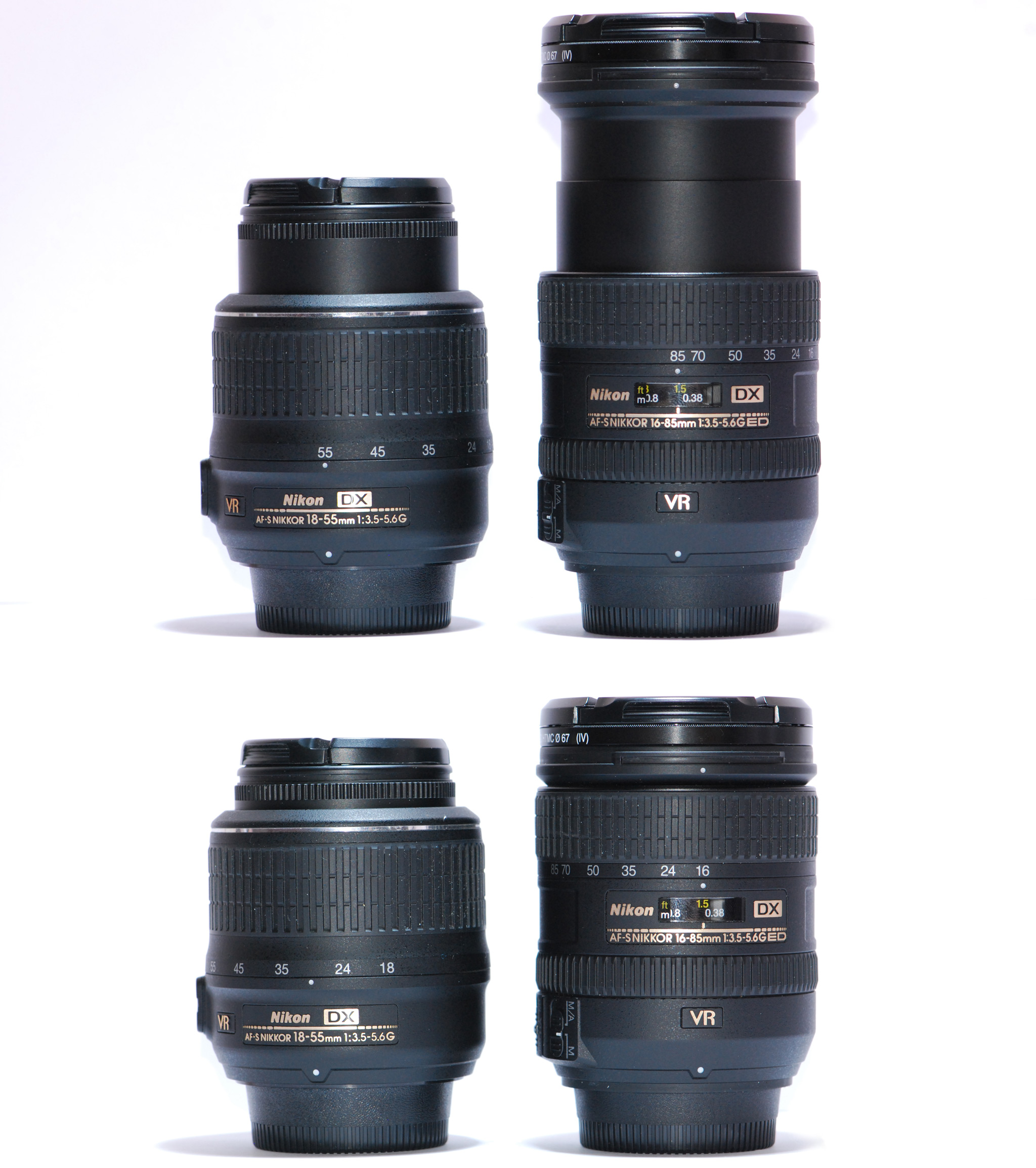
Nikon AF-S DX Nikkor 18-55mm f/3.5-5.6G VR and AF-S DX Nikkor 16-85mm VR f/3.5-5.6G IF-ED comparison

=== Primes ===
==== Wide-angle ====
- Nikon AF-S Nikkor 20mm f/1.8G ED
- Nikon AF-S Nikkor 24mm f/1.4G ED
- Nikon AF-S Nikkor 24mm f/1.8G ED
- Nikon AF-S Nikkor 28mm f/1.8G
- Nikon AF-S Nikkor 28mm f/1.4E ED

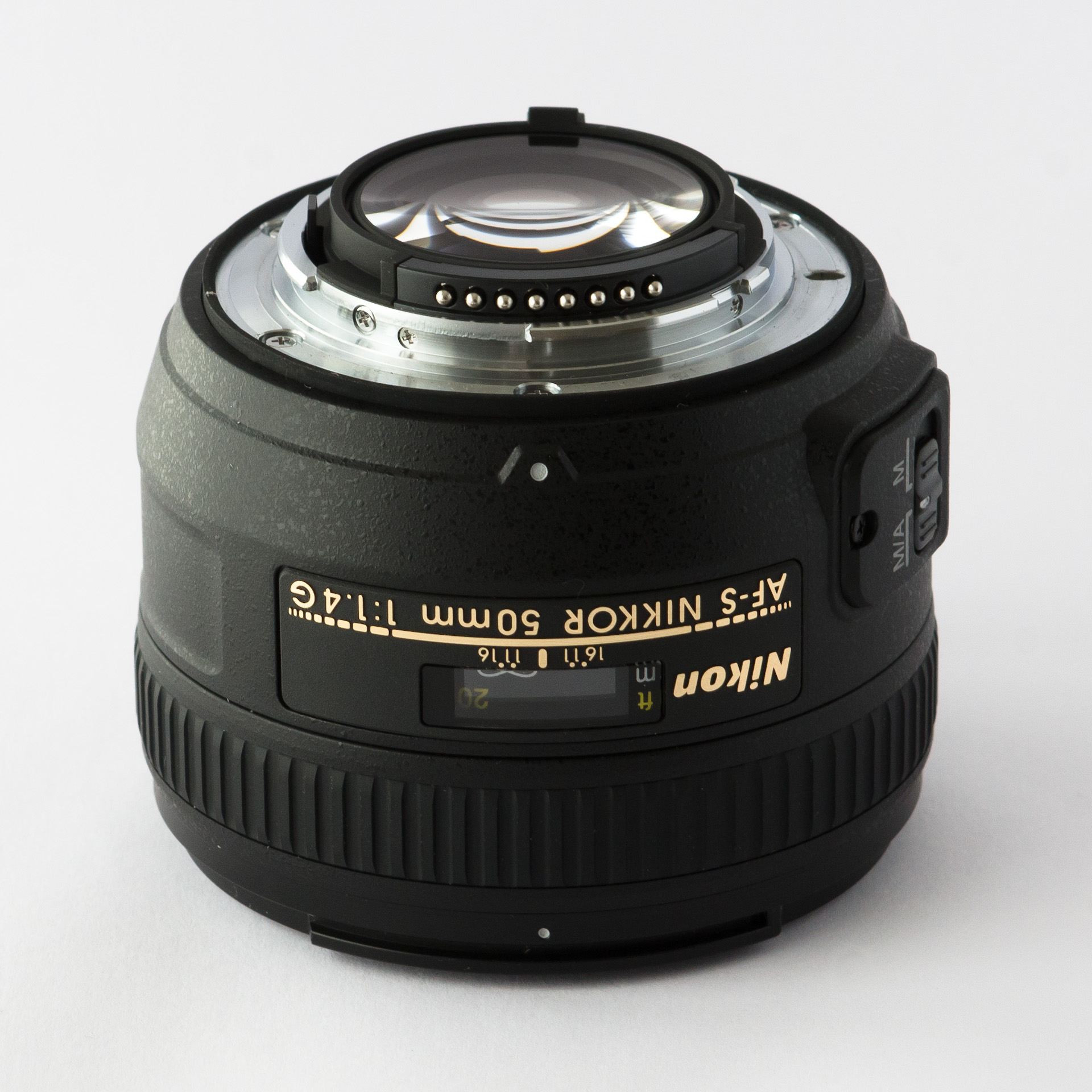
Nikon AF-S Nikkor 50mm f/1.4G back showing eight electrical contacts. Typical AF-S lenses have 7–10 contacts (with VR: 10) increased from about five contacts from AF or AF-D lenses.

==== Mid-range ====
- Nikon AF-S DX Nikkor 35mm f/1.8G
- Nikon AF-S Nikkor 35mm f/1.4G
- Nikon AF-S Nikkor 35mm f/1.8G ED
- Nikon AF-S Nikkor 50mm f/1.4G
- Nikon AF-S Nikkor 50mm f/1.8G
- Nikon AF-S Nikkor 58mm f/1.4G

==== Telephoto ====
- Nikon AF-S Nikkor 85mm f/1.4G
- Nikon AF-S Nikkor 85mm f/1.8G
- Nikon AF-S Nikkor 105mm f/1.4E ED
- Nikon AF-S Nikkor 200mm f/2G VR IF-ED
- Nikon AF-S Nikkor 200mm f/2G ED VR II
- Nikon AF-I Nikkor 300mm f/2.8D IF-ED^{†}
- Nikon AF-S Nikkor 300mm f/2.8D IF-ED^{†}
- Nikon AF-S Nikkor 300mm f/2.8D IF-ED II^{†}
- Nikon AF-S Nikkor 300mm f/2.8G VR IF-ED
- Nikon AF-S Nikkor 300mm f/2.8G ED VR II
- Nikon AF-S Nikkor 300mm f/4E PF ED VR
- Nikon AF-S Nikkor 300mm f/4D IF-ED

==== Super-telephoto ====
- Nikon AF-I Nikkor 400mm f/2.8D IF-ED^{†}
- Nikon AF-S Nikkor 400mm f/2.8D IF-ED^{†}
- Nikon AF-S Nikkor 400mm f/2.8D IF-ED II^{†}
- Nikon AF-S Nikkor 400mm f/2.8G VR IF-ED
- Nikon AF-S Nikkor 400mm f/2.8E FL ED VR
- Nikon AF-I Nikkor 500mm f/4D IF-ED´^{†}
- Nikon AF-S Nikkor 500mm f/4D IF-ED^{†}
- Nikon AF-S Nikkor 500mm f/4D IF-ED II^{†}
- Nikon AF-S Nikkor 500mm f/4G VR IF-ED
- Nikon AF-S Nikkor 500mm f/5.6E PF ED VR
- Nikon AF-I Nikkor 600mm f/4D IF-ED^{†}
- Nikon AF-S Nikkor 600mm f/4D IF-ED^{†}
- Nikon AF-S Nikkor 600mm f/4D IF-ED II^{†}
- Nikon AF-S Nikkor 600mm f/4G VR IF-ED
- Nikon AF-S Nikkor 600mm f/4E FL ED VR
- Nikon AF-S Nikkor 800mm f/5.6E FL ED VR (Note: Teleconverter designed exclusively for the AF-S Nikkor 800mm f/5.6E FL ED VR.)

==== Macro ====
- Nikon AF-S DX Micro-Nikkor 40mm f/2.8G
- Nikon AF-S Micro-Nikkor 60mm f/2.8G IF-ED
- Nikon AF-S DX Micro-Nikkor 85mm f/3.5G ED VR
- Nikon AF-S Micro-Nikkor 105mm f/2.8G VR IF-ED

=== Zooms ===
==== Fisheye ====
- Nikon AF-S Fisheye Nikkor 8-15mm f/3.5-4.5E ED

==== Wide-angle ====
- Nikon AF-P DX Nikkor 10-20mm f/4.5-5.6G VR
- Nikon AF-S DX Zoom-Nikkor 10-24mm f/3.5-4.5G ED
- Nikon AF-S Zoom-Nikkor DX 12-24mm f/4G IF-ED
- Nikon AF-S Zoom-Nikkor 14-24mm f/2.8G IF-ED
- Nikon AF-S Zoom-Nikkor 16-35mm f/4G ED VR
- Nikon AF-S Zoom-Nikkor 17-35mm f/2.8D IF-ED
- Nikon AF-S Zoom-Nikkor 18-35mm f/3.5-4.5G ED

==== Mid-range ====
- Nikon AF-S Zoom-Nikkor 16–80mm f/2.8–4E DX VR
- Nikon AF-S DX Zoom-Nikkor 16-85mm VR f/3.5-5.6G IF-ED
- Nikon AF-S DX Zoom-Nikkor 17-55mm f/2.8G IF-ED
- Nikon AF-S DX Zoom-Nikkor 18-55mm f/3.5-5.6G ED^{†}
- Nikon AF-S DX Zoom-Nikkor 18-55mm f/3.5-5.6G ED II^{†}
- Nikon AF-S DX Zoom-Nikkor 18-55mm f/3.5-5.6G VR^{†}
- Nikon AF-S DX Zoom-Nikkor 18-55mm f/3.5-5.6G VR II
- Nikon AF-P DX Nikkor 18–55mm f/3.5-5.6G VR
- Nikon AF-P DX Nikkor 18–55mm f/3.5-5.6G
- Nikon AF-S DX Zoom-Nikkor 18-70mm f/3.5-4.5G IF-ED
- Nikon AF-S Zoom-Nikkor 24-70mm f/2.8G IF-ED
- Nikon AF-S Zoom-Nikkor 24-70mm f/2.8E ED VR
- Nikon AF-S Zoom-Nikkor 24-85mm f/3.5-4.5G IF-ED
- Nikon AF-S Zoom-Nikkor 24–85mm f/3.5-4.5G ED VR IF
- Nikon AF-S Zoom-Nikkor 24-120mm f/3.5-5.6G VR IF-ED
- Nikon AF-S Zoom-Nikkor 24-120mm f/4G ED VR
- Nikon AF-S Zoom-Nikkor 28-70mm f/2.8D IF-ED

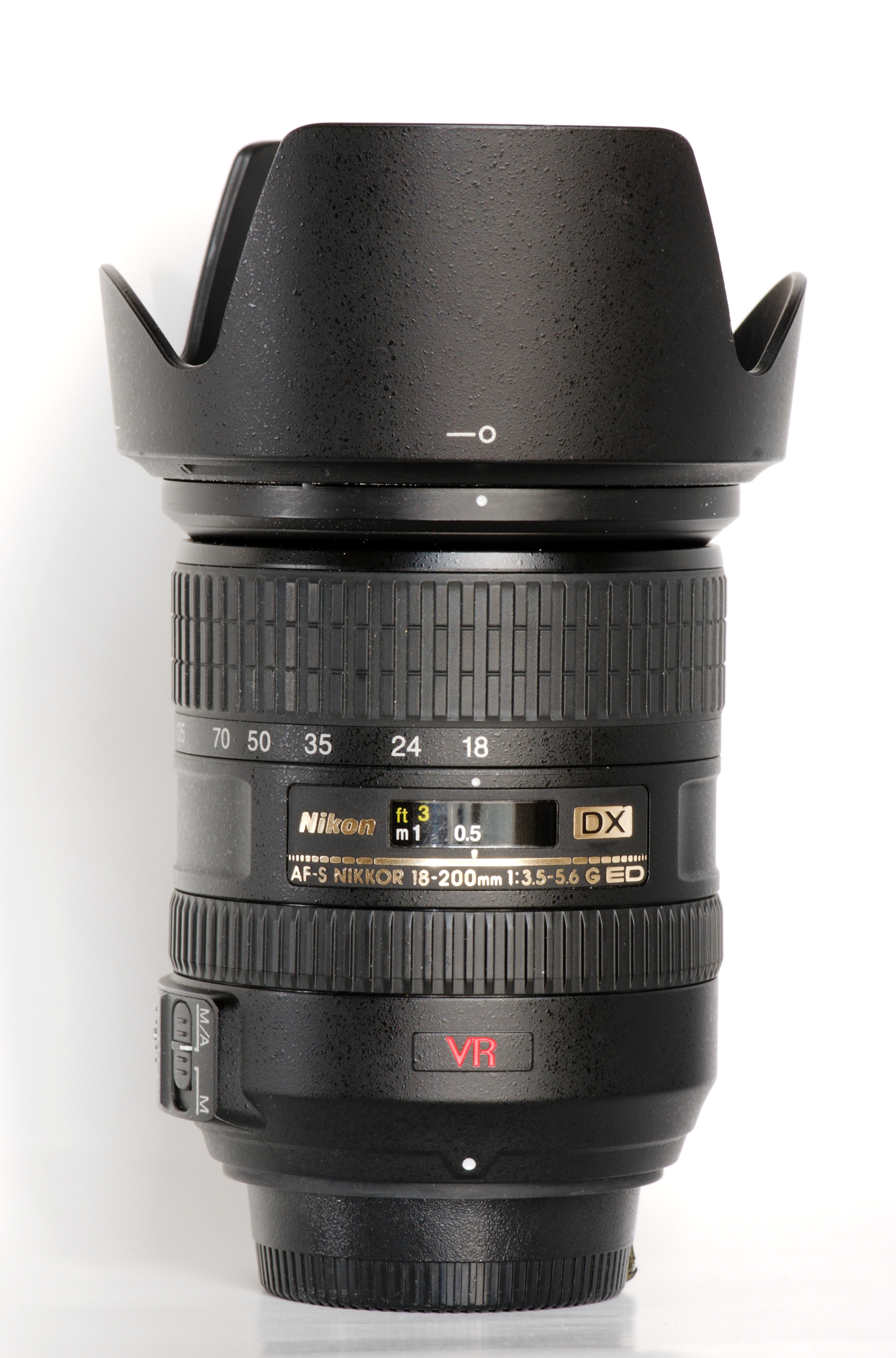
Nikon AF-S DX Nikkor 18-200mm f/3.5-5.6 VR IF-ED lens with HB-35 lens hood

==== Super-zoom ====
- Nikon AF-S DX Zoom-Nikkor 18-105mm f/3.5-5.6G ED VR
- Nikon AF-S DX Zoom-Nikkor 18-135mm f/3.5-5.6G IF-ED
- Nikon AF-S DX Zoom-Nikkor 18-140mm f/3.5-5.6G ED VR
- Nikon AF-S Zoom-Nikkor 18-200mm f/3.5-5.6G DX VR IF-ED
- Nikon AF-S Zoom-Nikkor 18-200mm f/3.5-5.6G ED-IF VR DX II
- Nikon AF-S Zoom-Nikkor 18–300mm f/3.5-5.6G DX ED VR IF
- Nikon AF-S Zoom-Nikkor 18–300mm f/3.5-6.3G DX ED VR
- Nikon AF-S Zoom-Nikkor 28-300mm f/3.5-5.6G ED VR

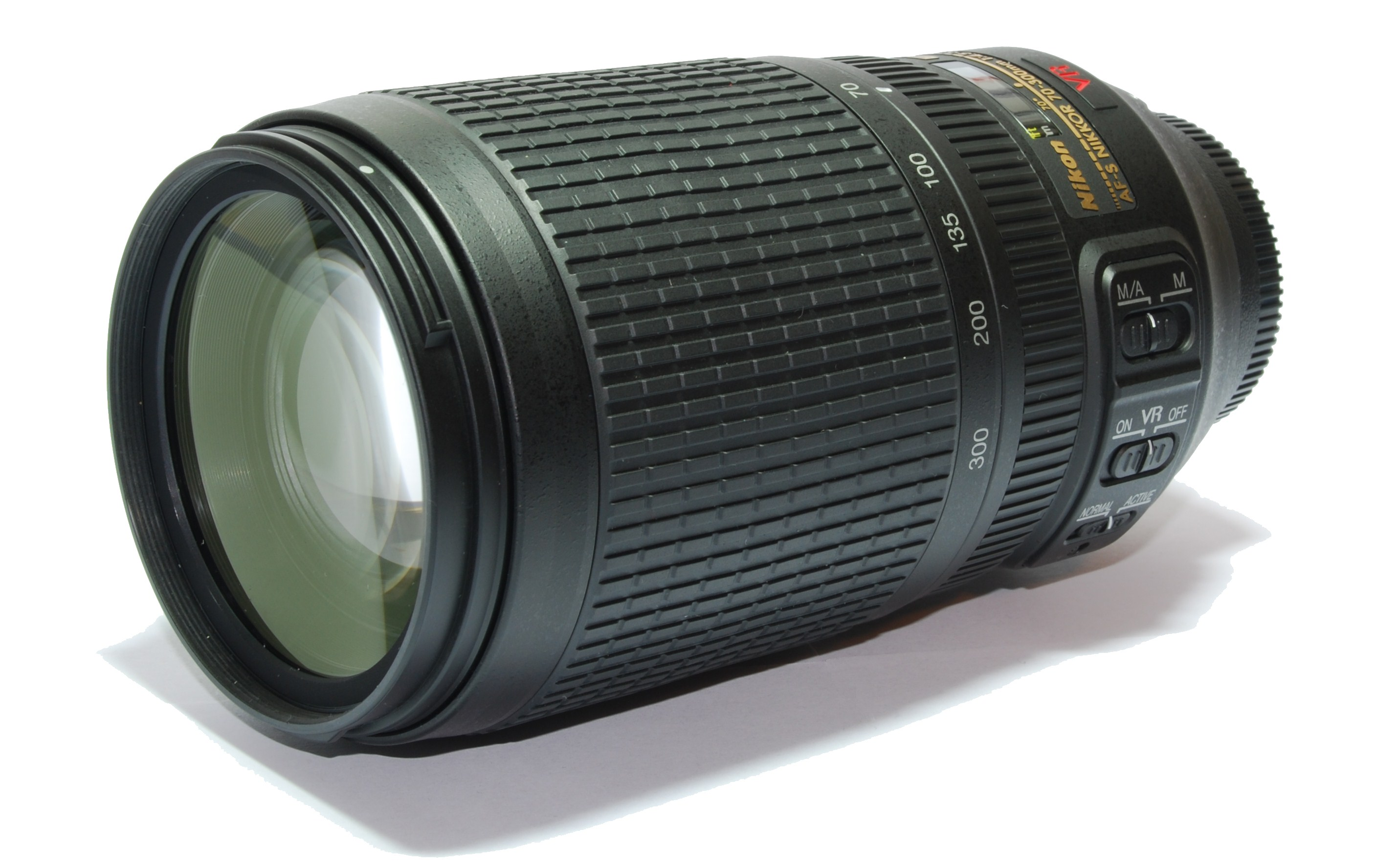
Nikon AF-S Zoom-Nikkor 70-300mm f/4.5-5.6G VR IF-ED

==== Telephoto ====
- Nikon AF-S DX Zoom-Nikkor 55-200mm f/4-5.6G ED^{†}
- Nikon AF-S DX Zoom-Nikkor 55-200mm f/4-5.6G VR IF-ED^{†}
- Nikon AF-S DX Nikkor 55-200mm f/4-5.6G ED VR II
- Nikon AF-S DX Zoom-Nikkor 55-300mm f/4.5-5.6G ED VR
- Nikon AF-S Zoom-Nikkor 70-200mm f/2.8G VR IF-ED
- Nikon AF-S Zoom-Nikkor 70-200mm f/2.8G ED VR II
- Nikon AF-S Nikkor 70-200mm f/2.8E FL ED VR
- Nikon AF-S Zoom-Nikkor 70-200mm f/4G ED VR
- Nikon AF-S Zoom-Nikkor 70-300mm f/4.5-5.6G VR IF-ED
- Nikon AF-P DX Nikkor 70-300mm f/4.5-6.3G ED
- Nikon AF-P Nikkor 70-300mm f/4.5-5.6E ED VR
- Nikon AF-P DX Nikkor 70-300mm f/4.5-6.3G ED VR
- Nikon AF-S Zoom-Nikkor 80-200mm f/2.8D ED^{†}
- Nikon AF-S Nikkor 120-300mm f/2.8E FL ED SR VR

==== Super-telephoto ====
- Nikon AF-S Zoom-Nikkor 80-400mm f/4.5-5.6G ED VR
- Nikon AF-S Zoom-Nikkor 200-400mm f/4G VR IF-ED^{†}
- Nikon AF-S Zoom-Nikkor 200-400mm f/4G ED VR II
- Nikon AF-S Zoom-Nikkor 180–400 f/4E TC1.4 FL ED VR
- Nikon AF-S Zoom-Nikkor 200-500mm f/5.6E ED VR

=== Teleconverter ===
- Nikon AF-S Teleconverter TC-20E III (Note: Will only mount original Nikon AF-S and AF-I lenses (without modification). Cannot mount lenses which jut out the F-mount. Not recommended for use with Nikon DX lenses although it works (with modification).)
- Nikon AF-S Teleconverter TC800-1.25E ED
- Nikon AF-S Teleconverter TC-14E II
- Nikon AF-S Teleconverter TC-14E III (announced, not yet available) (Note: Although it will physically mount on original Nikon AF-S and AF-I lenses (without modification), it is not compatible with AF-I or some older AF-S lenses because two electrical contacts used to pass certain lens information were removed. Cannot mount lenses which jut out the F-mount. Not recommended for use with Nikon DX lenses although it works (with modification).)
- Nikon AF-S Teleconverter TC-17E II
- Nikon AF-S Teleconverter TC-20E II
- Nikon AF-I Teleconverter TC-14E^{†}
- Nikon AF-I Teleconverter TC-20E^{†}

Nikon notes:

== Sigma lenses ==
=== Primes ===
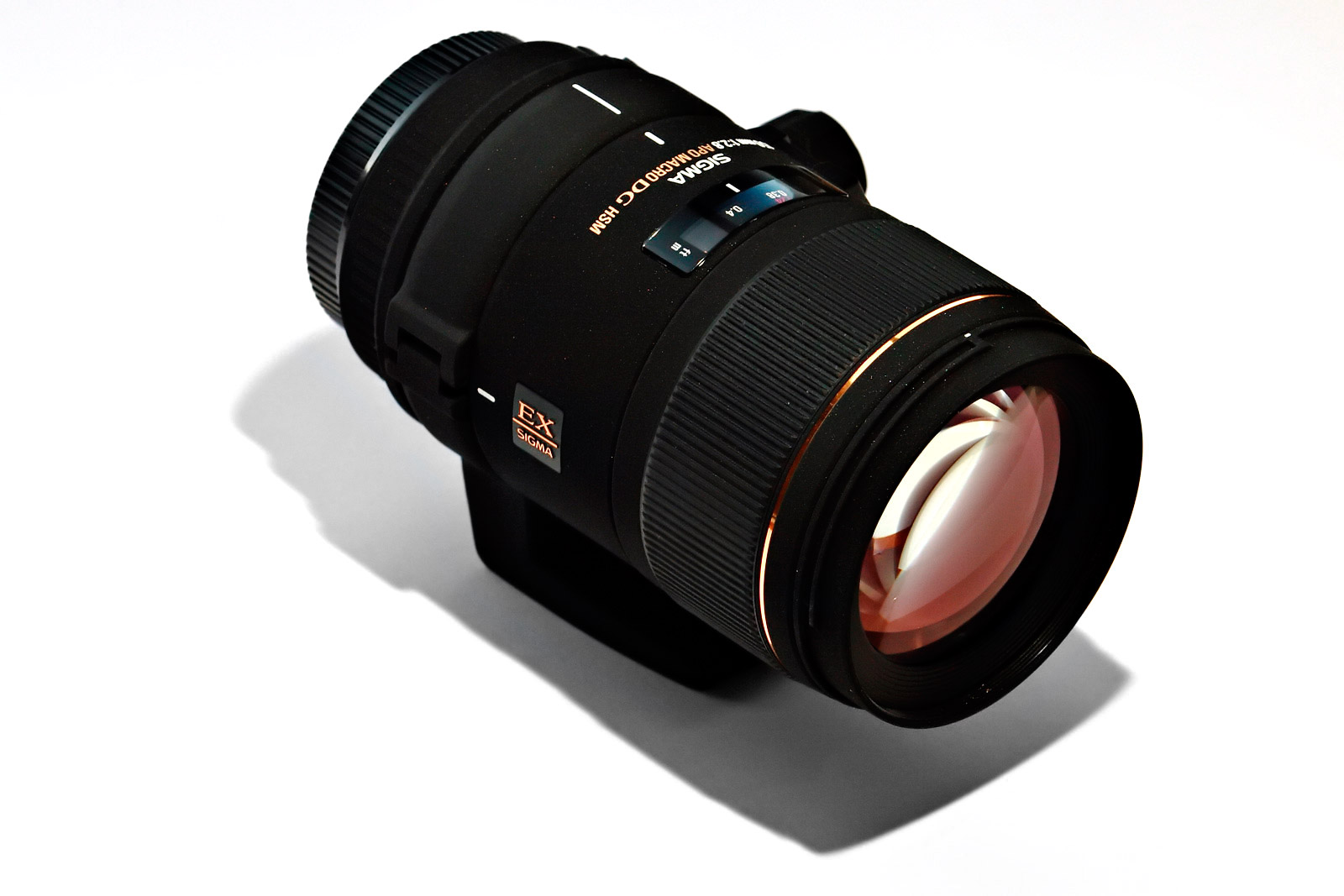
Sigma 150mm f/2.8 APO EX DG HSM Macro

==== Fisheye ====
- Sigma 4.5mm f/2.8 EX DC Circular Fisheye HSM
- Sigma 10mm f/2.8 EX DC HSM Diagonal fisheye

==== Wide-angle ====
- Sigma 14mm f/2.8 EX HSM RF APO^{†}
- Sigma 14mm f/1.8 DG HSM "A"
- Sigma 20mm f/1.4 DG HSM "A"
- Sigma 24mm f/1.4 DG HSM "A"
- Sigma 28mm f/1.4 DG HSM "A"

==== Mid-range ====
- Sigma 30mm f/1.4 EX DC HSM
- Sigma 30mm f/1.4 DC HSM "A"
- Sigma 35mm f/1.4 DG HSM "A"
- Sigma 40mm f/1.4 DG HSM "A"
- Sigma 50mm f/1.4 EX DG HSM
- Sigma 50mm f/1.4 DG HSM "A"

==== Telephoto ====
- Sigma 85mm f/1.4 EX DG HSM
- Sigma 85mm f/1.4 DG HSM "A"
- Sigma 105mm f/1.4 DG HSM "A"
- Sigma 135mm f/1.8 DG HSM "A"
- Sigma 300mm f/2.8 EX DG APO HSM

==== Super-telephoto ====
- Sigma 500mm f/4 DG HSM OS "S"
- Sigma 500mm f/4.5 EX DG HSM APO
- Sigma 800mm f/5.6 EX DG HSM APO

==== Macro ====
- Sigma 28mm f/1.8 EX DG Macro
- Sigma 105mm f/2.8 Macro EX DG OS HSM
- Sigma 150mm f/2.8 APO Macro EX DG OS HSM
- Sigma 150mm f/2.8 APO EX DG HSM Macro
- Sigma 180mm f/3.5 APO EX DG IF HSM Macro^{†}
- Sigma 180mm f/2.8 EX DG OS HSM APO Macro

=== Zooms ===
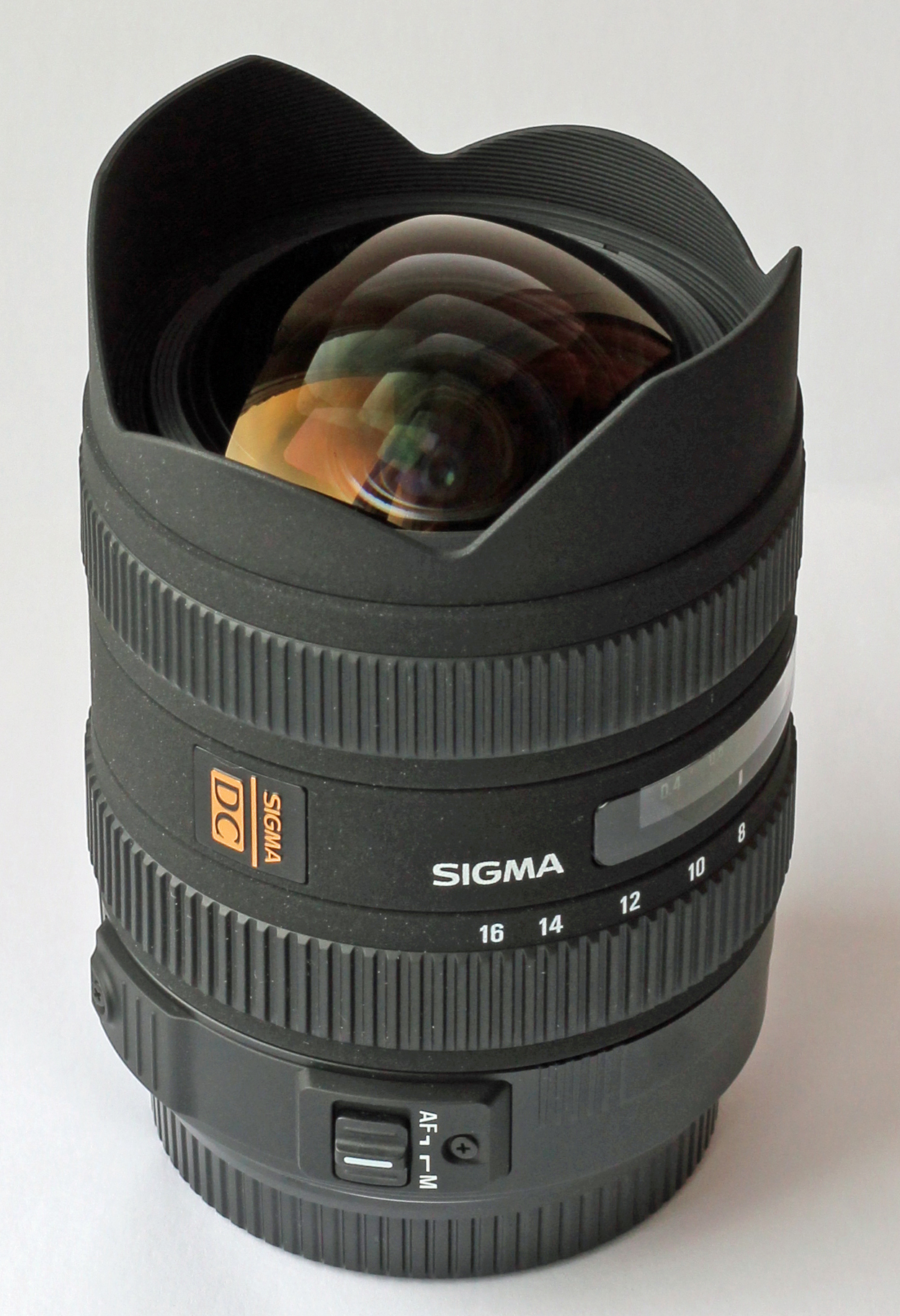
Sigma 8-16mm f/4.5-5.6 DC HSM extreme wide-angle lens

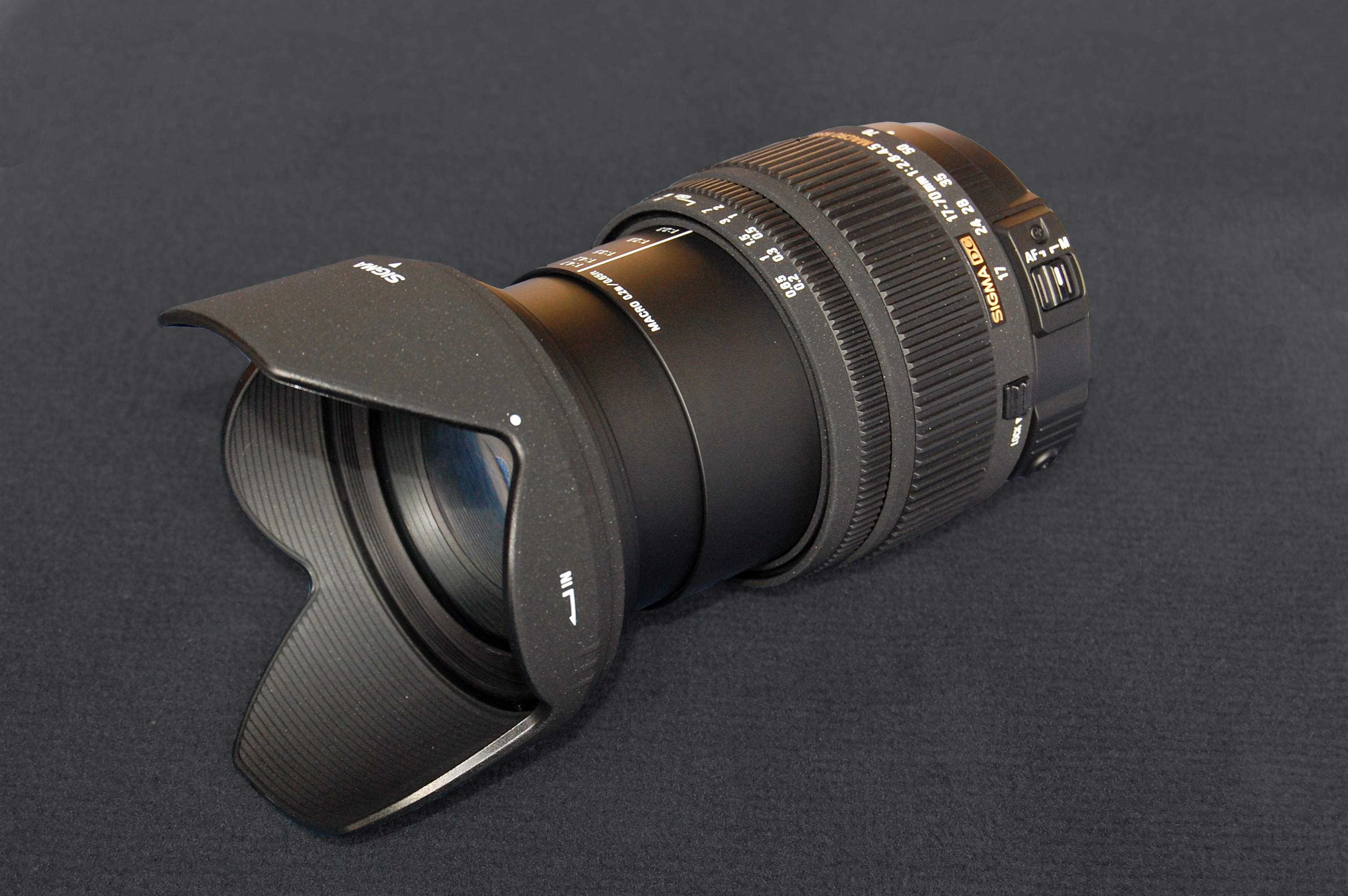
Sigma 17-70mm f/2.8-4.5 DC Macro HSM

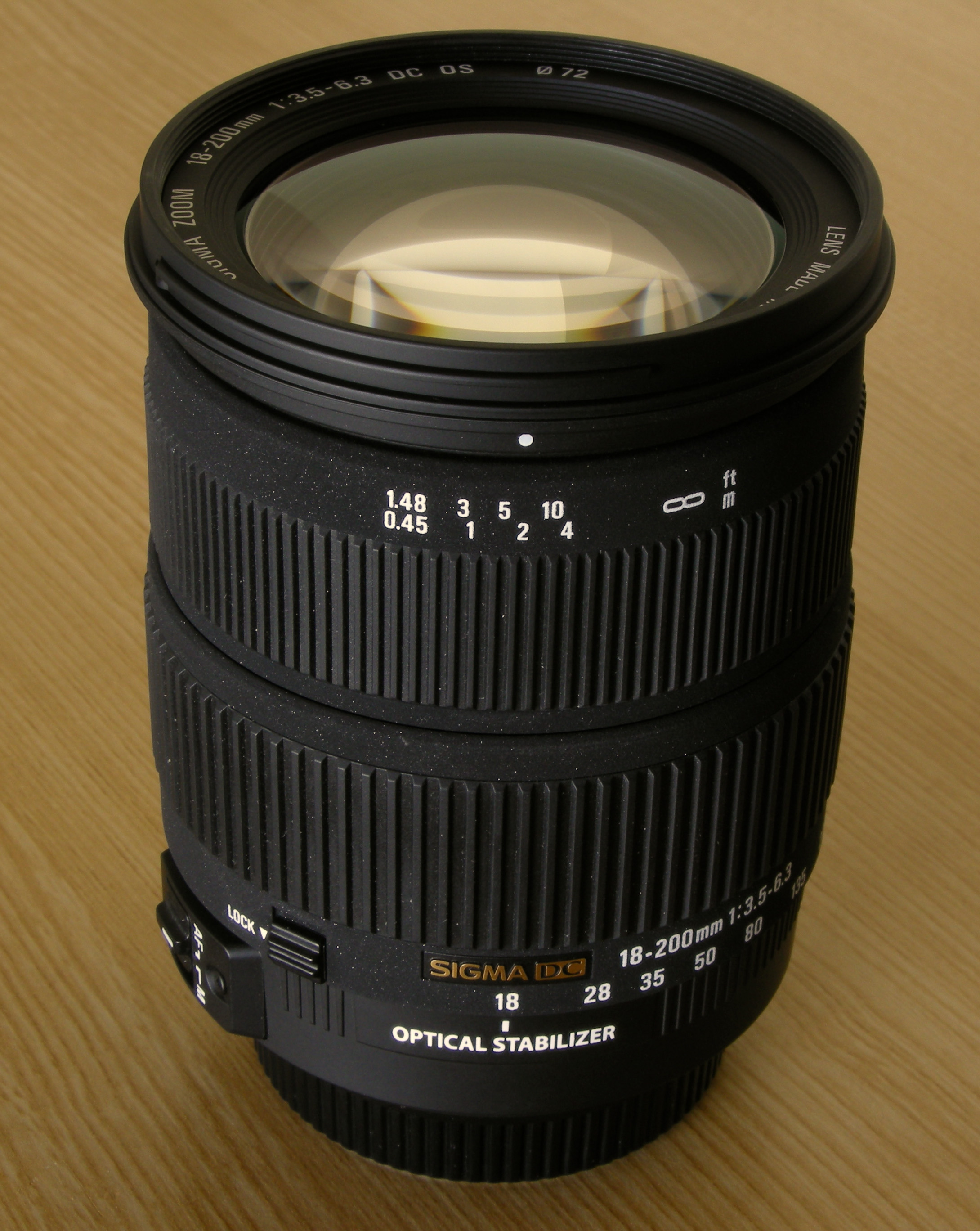
Sigma 18-200mm f/3.5-6.3 DC OS HSM

==== Wide-angle ====
- Sigma 8-16mm f/4.5–5.6 DC HSM
- Sigma 10–20mm f/3.5 EX DC HSM
- Sigma 10-20mm f/4–5.6 EX DC HSM
- Sigma 12–24mm f/4.5–5.6 EX DG ASPHERICAL HSM
- Sigma 12–24mm f/4.5–5.6 DG HSM II
- Sigma 12-24mm f/4 DG HSM "Art"
- Sigma 14-24mm f/2.8 DG HSM "Art"
- Sigma 17–35mm f/2.8–4 EX DG ASPHERICAL HSM^{†}

==== Mid-range ====
- Sigma 17-50mm f/2.8 EX DC OS HSM
- Sigma 17–70mm f/2.8-4.5 DC Macro HSM^{†}
- Sigma 17–70mm f/2.8-4.5 DC HSM "for Nikon Only^{†}
- Sigma 17–70mm f/2.8–4 DC Macro OS HSM
- Sigma 17–70mm f/2.8–4 DC Macro OS HSM "C"
- Sigma 18–35mm f/1.8 DC HSM "A"
- Sigma 18-50mm f/2.8 EX DC HSM Macro^{†}
- Sigma 18–50mm f/2.8 EX DC HSM "for Nikon only^{†}
- Sigma 18-50mm f/2.8-4.5 DC OS HSM
- Sigma 18–50mm f/3.5-5.6 DC HSM
- Sigma 24-35mm f/2 DG HSM "A"
- Sigma 24–70mm f/2.8 EX DG HSM
- Sigma 24-70mm f/2.8 DG OS HSM "A"
- Sigma 24-105mm f/4 DG OS HSM "A"

==== Super-zoom ====
- Sigma 18-125mm f/3.8-5.6 DC OS HSM
- Sigma 18-200mm f/3.5-6.3 DC
- Sigma 18-200mm f/3.5-6.3 DC OS^{†}
- Sigma 18-200mm f/3.5-6.3 DC OS HSM
- Sigma 18-200mm f/3.5-6.3 II DC OS HSM
- Sigma 18-200mm f/3.5-6.3 DC Macro OS HSM "C"
- Sigma 18-250mm f/3.5-6.3 DC OS HSM
- Sigma 18-250mm f/3.5-6.3 DC Macro OS HSM
- Sigma 18-300mm f/3.5-6.3 DC Macro OS HSM "C"

==== Telephoto ====
- Sigma 50-100mm f/1.8 DC HSM "A"
- Sigma 50-150mm f/2.8 APO EX DC HSM^{†}
- Sigma 50-150mm f/2.8 APO II EX DC HSM
- Sigma 50-150mm f/2.8 EX DC APO OS HSM
- Sigma 50-200mm f/4-5.6 DC OS HSM
- Sigma 55-200mm f/4-5.6 DC HSM (685955)
- Sigma 70-200mm f/2.8 APO EX DG HSM Macro
- Sigma 70-200mm f/2.8 EX DG OS HSM
- Sigma 70-200mm f/2.8 DG OS HSM "S"
- Sigma 70-300mm f/4.0-5.6 DG Macro^{†}
- Sigma 70-300mm f/4.0-5.6 DG APO Macro
- Sigma 70-300mm f/4-5.6 DG OS
- Sigma 100-300mm f/4 APO EX DG HSM^{†}
- Sigma 100-400mm f/5-6.3 DG HSM OS "C"
- Sigma 120-300mm f/2.8 APO EX DG HSM
- Sigma 120-300mm f/2.8 APO EX DG OS HSM
- Sigma 120-300mm f/2.8 DG OS HSM "S"

==== Super-telephoto ====
- Sigma 50-500mm f/4-6.3 APO EX DG HSM
- Sigma 50-500mm f/4.5-6.3 DG OS HSM
- Sigma 60-600mm f/4.5-6.3 DG OS HSM "S"
- Sigma 80-400mm f/4-5.6 EX DG APO OS^{†}
- Sigma 80-400mm f/4.5-5.6 EX DG APO OS
- Sigma 120-400mm f/4.5-5.6 DG OS APO HSM
- Sigma150-500mm f/5-6.3 DG OS APO HSM
- Sigma 150-600mm f/5-6.3 DG OS HSM "C"
- Sigma 150-600mm f/5-6.3 DG OS HSM "S"
- Sigma 200-500mm f/2.8 APO EX DG
- Sigma 300–800 f/5.6 APO EX DG HSM

=== Teleconverter ===
- Sigma TELE CONVERTER TC-1401 1.4x
- Sigma TELE CONVERTER TC-2001 2.0x
- Sigma TELE CONVERTER APO EX DG 1.4x (Note: Only recommended for a list of lenses and only some of them will autofocus. Needs lenses with integrated motor for AF. Not recommended for use with DX lenses.)
- Sigma TELE CONVERTER APO EX DG 2.0x

Sigma notes:

== Tamron lenses ==
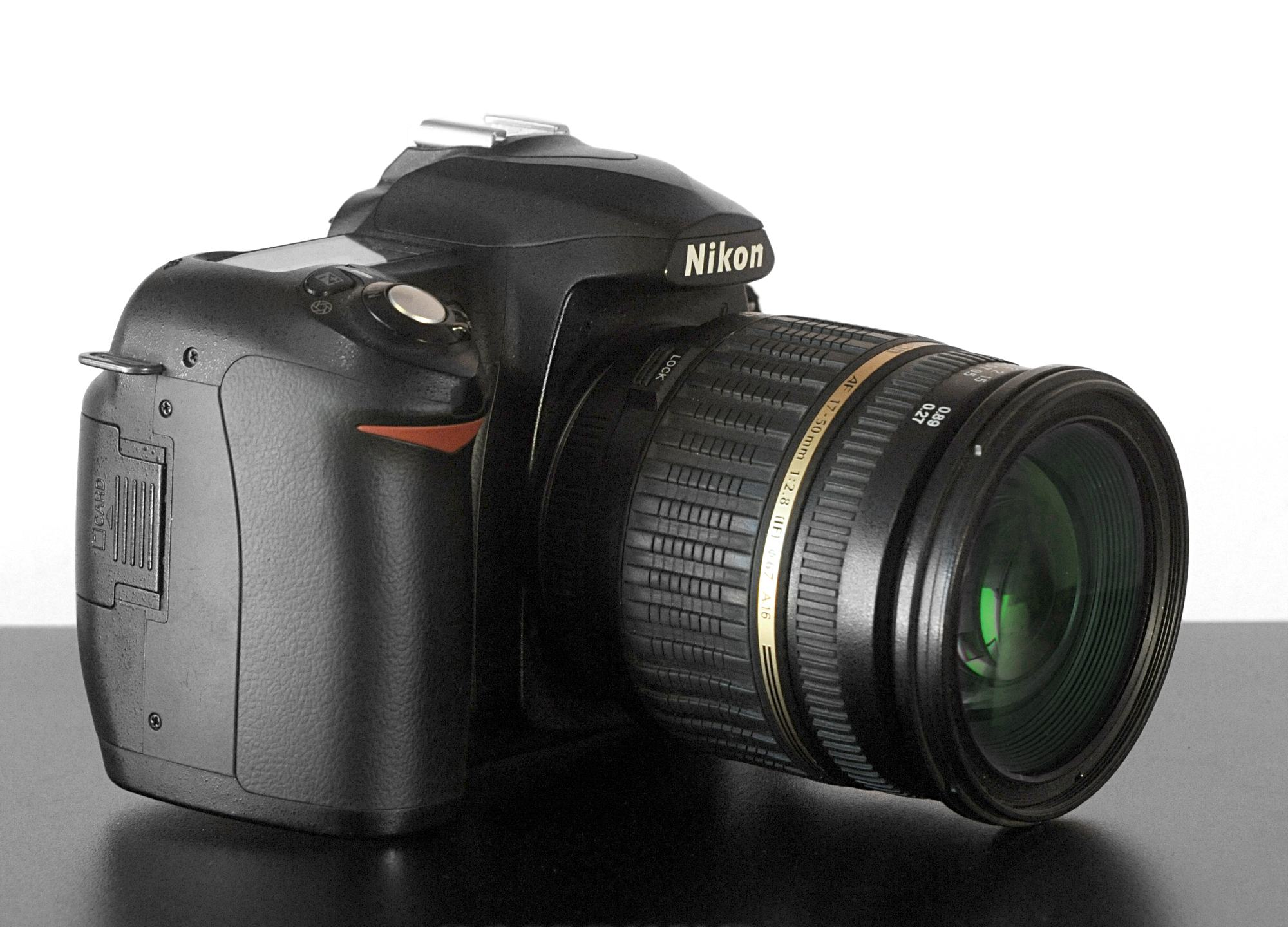
Tamron SP AF 17-50mm f/2.8 XR Di II LD Aspherical [IF] (model A16NII) with Nikon D50

=== Primes ===
==== Mid-range ====
- Tamron 35mm f/1.4 Di USD (model F045)
- Tamron 35mm f/1.8 Di VC USD (model F012)
- Tamron 45mm f/1.8 Di VC USD (model F013)

==== Telephoto ====
- Tamron 85mm f/1.8 Di VC USD (model F016)

==== Macro ====
- Tamron SP AF 60mm f/2 Di II LD [IF] Macro 1:1 (model G005NII)
- Tamron SP AF 90mm f/2.8 Di Macro 1:1 (model 272ENII)
- Tamron SP 90mm f/2.8 Di VC USD Macro 1:1 (model F004N)
- Tamron SP 90mm f/2.8 Di Macro 1:1 VC USD (model F017)

=== Zooms ===
==== Wide-angle zoom ====
- Tamron SP AF 10-24mm f/3.5-4.5 Di II LD Aspherical [IF] (model B001NII)
- Tamron 10-24mm f/3.5-4.5 Di II VC HLD (model B023)
- Tamron SP 15-30mm f/2.8 Di VC USD (model A012N)
- Tamron SP 15-30mm f/2.8 Di VC USD G2 (model A041)
- Tamron 17-35mm f/2.8-4 Di OSD

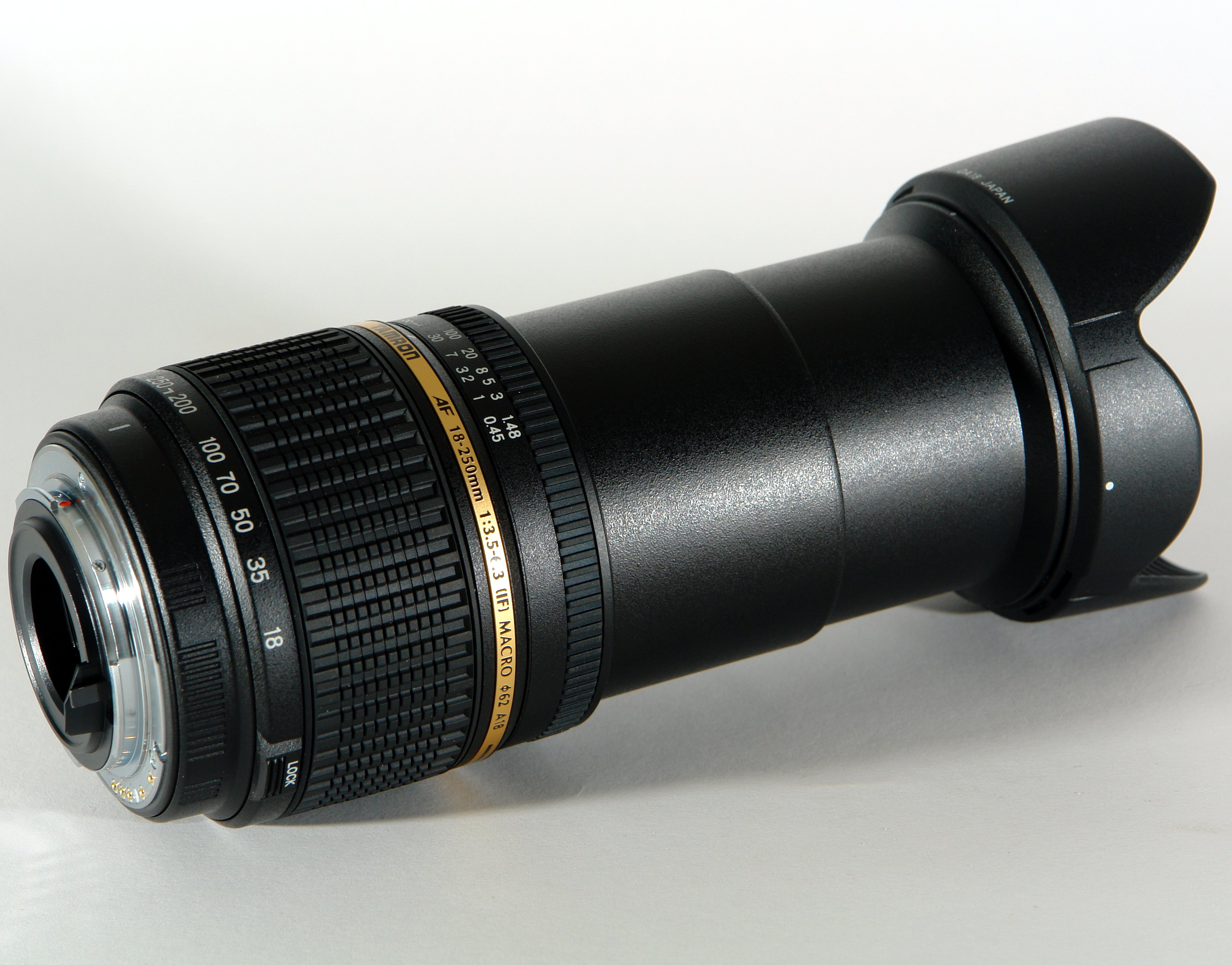
Tamron AF 18-250mm f/3.5-6.3 Di II LD Aspherical [IF] Macro (model A18NII)

==== Mid-range zoom ====
- Tamron SP AF 17-50mm f/2.8 XR Di II LD Aspherical [IF] (model A16NII)
- Tamron SP AF 17-50mm f/2.8 XR Di II VC LD Aspherical [IF] (model B005NII)
- Tamron SP 24-70mm f/2.8 Di VC USD (model A007N)
- Tamron SP 24-70mm f/2.8 Di VC USD G2 (model A032N)
- Tamron SP AF 28-75mm f/2.8 XR Di LD Aspherical [IF] Macro (model A09NII)
- Tamron SP AF 28-105mm f/2.8 LD Aspherical IF
- Tamron 35-150mm f/2.8-4 Di VC OSD (model A043)

==== Super-zoom ====
- Tamron 16-300mm f/3.5-6.3 Di II VC PZD Macro (model B016N)
- Tamron AF 18-200mm f/3.5-6.3 XR Di II LD Aspherical [IF] (model A14NII)
- Tamron AF 18-250mm f/3.5-6.3 Di II LD Aspherical [IF] Macro (model A18NII)
- Tamron AF 18-270mm f/3.5-6.3 Di II VC LD Aspherical [IF] Macro (model B003NII)
- Tamron 18-270mm f/3.5-6.3 Di II VC PZD (model B008N)
- Tamron 18-400mm f/3.5-6.3 Di II VC HLD (model B028)
- Tamron AF 28-300mm f/3.5-6.3 XR Di VC LD Aspherical [IF] (model A20NII)
- Tamron 28-300mm f/3.5-6.3 Di VC PZD (model A010N)

==== Telephoto zoom ====
- Tamron AF 55-200mm f/4-5.6 Di II LD Macro (model A15NII)
- Tamron SP AF 70-200mm f/2.8 Di LD [IF] Macro (model A001NII)
- Tamron SP 70-200mm f/2.8 Di VC USD (model A009N)
- Tamron SP 70-200mm f/2.8 Di VC USD G2 (model A025)
- Tamron AF 70-300mm f/4-5.6 Di LD Macro 1:2 (model A17NII)
- Tamron SP 70-300mm f/4-5.6 Di VC USD (model A005NII)

==== Super-telephoto zoom ====
- Tamron 100-400mm f/4.5-6.3 Di VC USD (model A035)
- Tamron SP 150-600mm f/5-6.3 Di VC USD (model A011N)
- Tamron SP 150-600mm f/5-6.3 Di VC USD G2 (model A022)

=== Teleconverter ===
- Tamron SP Pro 1.4x (Note: Needs lenses with integrated motor for AF.)
- Tamron SP Pro 2x

Tamron notes:

== Tokina lenses ==
=== Primes ===
==== Mid-range ====
- Tokina 50mm f/1.4 Opera FX

==== Macro ====
- Tokina 100mm f/2.8 atx-i Macro Plus FX

=== Zooms ===
==== Wide-angle zoom ====
- Tokina 10-17mm f/3.5-4.5 fisheye DX AT-X
- Tokina 11-16mm f/2.8 AT-X 116 PRO DX II
- Tokina 11-16mm f/2.8 AT-X 116 PRO DX "{MPN T4111603}"
- Tokina 11-16mm f/2.8 atx-i CF Plus DX
- Tokina 11-20mm f/2.8 AT-X PRO SD (IF) DX
- Tokina 11-20mm f/2.8 atx-i CF Plus DX
- Tokina 12-24mm f/4 AT-X 124 PRO DX II
- Tokina 12-28mm f/4 AT-X PRO DX (MPN 4961607696675)
- Tokina 14-20mm f/2 AT-X PRO DX
- Tokina 16-28mm f/2.8 AT-X PRO FX
- Tokina 16-28mm f/2.8 Opera FX
- Tokina 17-35mm f/4 AT-X PRO FX
- Tokina 17-35mm f/4 atx-i FX

==== Mid-range zoom ====
- Tokina 24-70mm f/2.8 AT-X PRO FX

==== Telephoto zoom ====
- Tokina AT-X Pro SD 50-135mm f/2.8 DX
- Tokina 70-200mm f/4 AT-X PRO FX VCM-S

Tokina notes:

== Yongnuo lenses ==
=== Prime ===
- Yongnuo YN 100mm f/2.0
- Yongnuo YN 85mm f/1.8
- Yongnuo YN 50mm f/1.8
- Yongnuo YN 50mm f/1.4
- Yongnuo YN 40mm f/2.8
- Yongnuo YN 35mm f/2.0
- Yongnuo YN 14mm f/2.8

== Kenko lenses ==
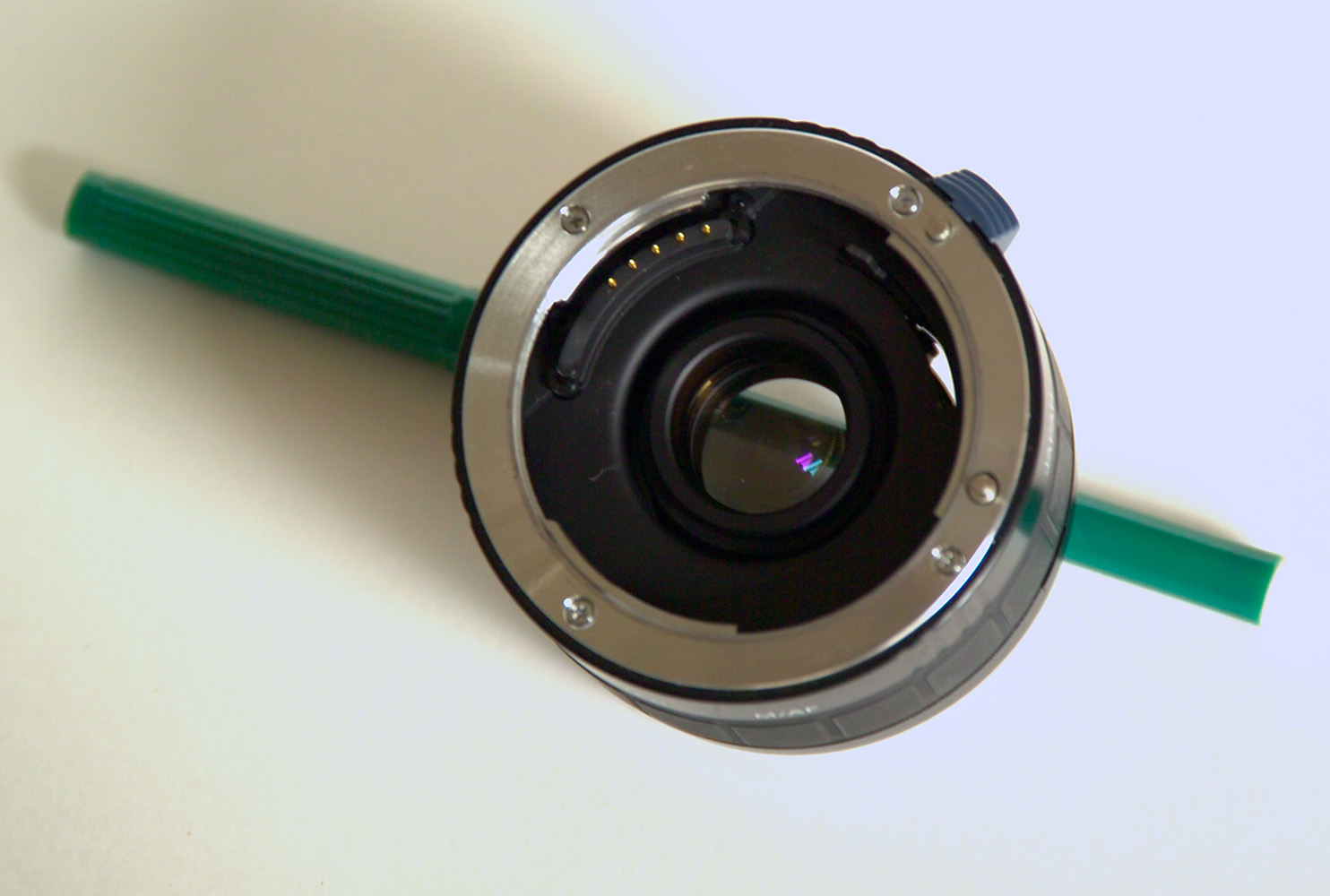
2x Teleconverter

=== Teleconverter ===
(Note: All listed Kenko teleconverters support lenses with and without integrated focus-motor, DX lenses as well as lenses which slightly jut out the F-mount.)

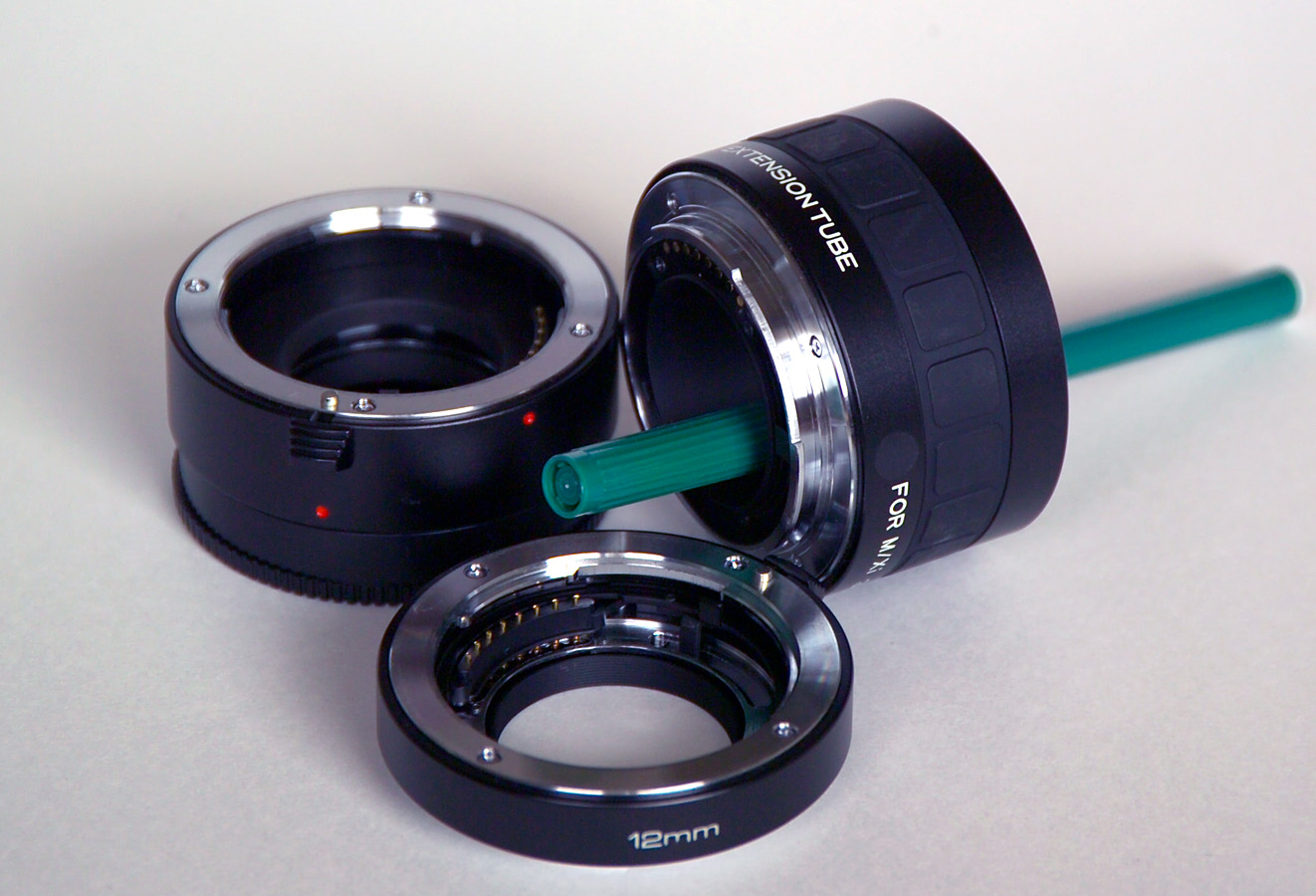
Lens extension tubes to focus closer for extreme macro use

- Kenko Teleplus Pro 300 1.4x^{†} (Note: Does not correct aperture or focal length.)
- Kenko Teleplus Pro 300 DG 1.4x
- Kenko TelePlus PRO 300 AF DGX 1.4x
- Kenko Teleplus Pro 300 2x^{†}
- Kenko Teleplus Pro 300 DG 2x
- Kenko TelePlus PRO 300 AF DGX 2x
- Kenko Teleplus Pro 300 3x^{†} (Note: Listed by Kenko without support for autofocus, however autofocus will work depending on lens speed, brightness and contrast.)
- Kenko Teleplus Pro 300 DG 3x
- Kenko TelePlus MC4 AF DGX 1.4x
- Kenko Teleplus MC4 AF DG 2x
- Kenko TelePlus MC4 AF DGX 2x
- Kenko Teleplus MC7 AF DG 2x
- Kenko TelePlus MC7 AF DGX 2x
- Kenko Teleplus K1.5 AF DG 1.5x

=== Extension tubes ===
(Note: All listed Kenko lens extension tubes support lenses with and without integrated focus-motor, DX lenses as well as lenses which jut out the F-mount. Affects focus range and aperture.)

- Kenko AUTO EXTENSION TUBE SET DG 12, 20 and 36mm
- Kenko EXTENSION RING UNIPLUS TUBE DG 12
- Kenko EXTENSION RING UNIPLUS TUBE DG 25

Kenko notes:

== Table of F-mount lenses ==
| Brand | Focal length | Aperture | FX/ DX | Des. | VR | L‑Fn | Zoom | Min focus distance | Mag. | Filter size | Diameter | Length | Weight | E/G | Release date |
|---|---|---|---|---|---|---|---|---|---|---|---|---|---|---|---|
| Nikkor | 8-15mm | f/3.5–4.5 | FX | E ED Fisheye | No | | Zoom | 0.16 m (0.52 ft) | 1:2.95 | 29x27 mm | 77.5 mm (3.05 in) | 83 mm (3.3 in) | 485 g (17.1 oz) | 15/13 | 2017-05-31 |
| Nikkor | 10-20mm | f/4.5–5.6 | DX | G VR | Yes | | Zoom | 0.22 m (0.72 ft) | 1:5.9 | 72 mm | 77 mm (3.0 in) | 73 mm (2.9 in) | 230 g (8.1 oz) | 14/11 | 2017-05-31 |
| Nikkor | 10-24mm | f/3.5–4.5 | DX | G ED | No | | Zoom | 0.24 m (0.79 ft) | 1:5 | 77 mm | 82.5 mm (3.25 in) | 87 mm (3.4 in) | 460 g (16 oz) | 14/9 | 2009-04-09 |
| Nikkor | 12-24mm | f/4 | DX | G IF-ED | No | | Zoom | 0.3 m (0.98 ft) | 1:8.3 | 77 mm | 82.5 mm (3.25 in) | 90 mm (3.5 in) | 465 g (16.4 oz) | 11/7 | 2003-02-18 |
| Nikkor | 14-24mm | f/2.8 | FX | G IF-ED | No | | Zoom | 0.28 m (0.92 ft) | 1:6.7 | | 98 mm (3.9 in) | 1,315 mm (51.8 in) | 970 g (34 oz) | 14/11 | 2007-08-27 |
| Nikkor | 16-35mm | f/4 | FX | G ED VR | Yes | | Zoom | 0.28 m (0.92 ft) | 1:4 | 77 mm | 82.5 mm (3.25 in) | 125 mm (4.9 in) | 680 g (24 oz) | 17/12 | 2010-02-09 |
| Nikkor | 20mm | f/1.8 | FX | G ED | No | | Prime | 0.2 m (0.66 ft) | 1:4.35 | 77 mm | 82.5 mm (3.25 in) | 80.5 mm (3.17 in) | 355 g (12.5 oz) | 13/11 | 2014-09-12 |
| Nikkor | 24mm | f/1.4 | FX | G ED | No | | Prime | 0.25 m (0.82 ft) | 1:5.5 | 77 mm | 83 mm (3.3 in) | 88.5 mm (3.48 in) | 620 g (22 oz) | 12/10 | 2010-02-09 |
| Nikkor | 24mm | f/1.8 | FX | G ED | No | | Prime | 0.23 m (0.75 ft) | 1:5 | 72 mm | 77.5 mm (3.05 in) | 83 mm (3.3 in) | 355 g (12.5 oz) | 12/11 | 2015-08-04 |
| Nikkor | 28mm | f/1.8 | FX | G | No | | Prime | 0.25 m (0.82 ft) | 1:4.5 | 67 mm | 73 mm (2.9 in) | 80.5 mm (3.17 in) | 330 g (12 oz) | 11/9 | 2012-04-19 |
| Nikkor | 28mm | f/1.4 | FX | E ED | No | | Prime | 0.28 m (0.92 ft) | 1:5.9 | 77 mm | 83 mm (3.3 in) | 100.5 mm (3.96 in) | 645 g (22.8 oz) | 14/11 | 2017-05-31 |
| Nikkor | 35mm | f/1.8 | DX | G | No | | Prime | 0.3 m (0.98 ft) | 1:6.25 | 52 mm | 70 mm (2.8 in) | 52.5 mm (2.07 in) | 210 g (7.4 oz) | 8/6 | 2009-02-09 |
| Nikkor | 35mm | f/1.4 | FX | G | No | | Prime | 0.3 m (0.98 ft) | 1:5 | 67 mm | 83 mm (3.3 in) | 89.5 mm (3.52 in) | 600 g (21 oz) | 10/7 | 2010-09-25 |
| Nikkor | 35mm | f/1.8 | FX | G ED | No | | Prime | 0.25 m (0.82 ft) | 1:4.1 | 58 mm | 72 mm (2.8 in) | 71.5 mm (2.81 in) | 305 g (10.8 oz) | 11/8 | 2014-01-07 |
| Nikkor | 40mm | f/2.8 | DX | G MICRO | No | | Prime | 0.163 m (0.53 ft) | 1:1 | 52 mm | 68.5 mm (2.70 in) | 64.5 mm (2.54 in) | 235 g (8.3 oz) | 9/7 | 2011-07-12 |
| Nikkor | 50mm | f/1.4 | FX | G | No | | Prime | 0.45 m (1.5 ft) | 1:6.5 | 58 mm | 73.5 mm (2.89 in) | 54 mm (2.1 in) | 290 g (10 oz) | 8/7 | 2008-09-22 |
| Nikkor | 50mm | f/1.8 | FX | G | No | | Prime | 0.45 m (1.5 ft) | 1:6.7 | 58 mm | 72 mm (2.8 in) | 52.5 mm (2.07 in) | 185 g (6.5 oz) | 7/6 | 2011-04-13 |
| Nikkor | 58mm | f/1.4 | FX | G | No | | Prime | 0.58 m (1.9 ft) | 1:7.7 | 72 mm | 85 mm (3.3 in) | 70 mm (2.8 in) | 385 g (13.6 oz) | 9/6 | 2013-10-07 |
| Nikkor | 60mm | f/2.8 | FX | G IF-ED MICRO | No | | Prime | 0.185 m (0.61 ft) | 1:1 | 62 mm | 73 mm (2.9 in) | 89 mm (3.5 in) | 425 g (15.0 oz) | 12/9 | 2008-01-29 |
| Nikkor | 85mm | f/1.4 | FX | G | No | | Prime | 0.85 m (2.8 ft) | 1:8.3 | 77 mm | 86.5 mm (3.41 in) | 84 mm (3.3 in) | 595 g (21.0 oz) | 10/9 | 2010-08-09 |
| Nikkor | 85mm | f/1.8 | FX | G | No | | Prime | 0.8 m (2.6 ft) | 1:8 | 67 mm | 80 mm (3.1 in) | 73 mm (2.9 in) | 350 g (12 oz) | 9/9 | 2012-01-06 |
| Nikkor | 85mm | f/3.5 | DX | G ED VR MICRO | Yes | | Prime | 0.286 m (0.94 ft) | 1:1 | 52 mm | 73 mm (2.9 in) | 98.5 mm (3.88 in) | 355 g (12.5 oz) | 14/10 | 2009-10-14 |
| Nikkor | 105mm | f/1.4 | FX | E ED | No | | Prime | 1 m (3.3 ft) | 1:7.7 | 82 mm | 94.5 mm (3.72 in) | 106 mm (4.2 in) | 985 g (34.7 oz) | 14/9 | 2016-07-27 |
| Nikkor | 105mm | f/2.8 | FX | G VR IF-ED MICRO | Yes | | Prime | 0.314 m (1.03 ft) | 1:1 | 52 mm | 83 mm (3.3 in) | 116 mm (4.6 in) | 720 g (25 oz) | 14/12 | 2006-02-21 |
| Nikkor | 200mm | f/2 | FX | G VR IF-ED | Yes | | Prime | 1.9 m (6.2 ft) | 1:8.1 | 52 mm | 124 mm (4.9 in) | 203 mm (8.0 in) | 2,900 g (100 oz) | 13/9 | 2004-07-01 |
| Nikkor | 200mm | f/2 | FX | G ED VR II | Yes | | Prime | 1.9 m (6.2 ft) | 1:8.1 | 52 mm | 124 mm (4.9 in) | 203.5 mm (8.01 in) | 2,930 g (103 oz) | 13/9 | 2010-09-15 |
| Nikkor | 300mm | f/2.8 | FX | G VR IF-ED | Yes | | Prime | 2.3 m (7.5 ft) | 1:6.4 | 52 mm | 124 mm (4.9 in) | 267.5 mm (10.53 in) | 2,870 g (101 oz) | 11/8 | 2004-09-15 |
| Nikkor | 300mm | f/2.8 | FX | G ED VR II | Yes | | Prime | 2.3 m (7.5 ft) | 1:6.3 | 52 mm | 124 mm (4.9 in) | 267.5 mm (10.53 in) | 2,900 g (100 oz) | 11/8 | 2009-12-10 |
| Nikkor | 300mm | f/4 | FX | E PF ED VR | Yes | | Prime | 1.4 m (4.6 ft) | 1:4.2 | 77 mm | 98 mm (3.9 in) | 147.5 mm (5.81 in) | 755 g (26.6 oz) | 16/10 | 2015-01-06 |
| Nikkor | 300mm | f/4 | FX | D IF-ED | No | | Prime | 1.45 m (4.8 ft) | 1:3.7 | 77 mm | 90 mm (3.5 in) | 222.5 mm (8.76 in) | 1,440 g (51 oz) | 10/6 | 2000-08-29 |
| Nikkor | 400mm | f/2.8 | FX | D IF-ED | No | | Prime | 3.8 m (12 ft) | | 52 mm | 159.5 mm (6.28 in) | 351.5 mm (13.84 in) | 4,800 g (170 oz) | 11/9 | 1998-01-01 |
| Nikkor | 400mm | f/2.8 | FX | D IF-ED II | No | | Prime | 3.5 m (11 ft) | 1:7.7 | 52 mm | 159.5 mm (6.28 in) | 351.5 mm (13.84 in) | 4,440 g (157 oz) | 11/9 | 2001-04-01 |
| Nikkor | 400mm | f/2.8 | FX | G VR IF-ED | Yes | | Prime | 2.9 m (9.5 ft) | 1:6.3 | 52 mm | 159.5 mm (6.28 in) | 368 mm (14.5 in) | 4,620 g (163 oz) | 14/11 | 2007-08-01 |
| Nikkor | 400mm | f/2.8 | FX | E FL ED VR | Yes | | Prime | 2.8 m (9.2 ft) | 1:5.9 | 40.5 mm | 159.5 mm (6.28 in) | 358 mm (14.1 in) | 3,800 g (130 oz) | 16/12 | 2014-05-14 |
| Nikkor | 500mm | f/4 | FX | D IF-ED II- | No | | Prime | 4.6 m (15 ft) | 1:8.2 | 52 mm | 139.5 mm (5.49 in) | 394 mm (15.5 in) | 3,430 g (121 oz) | 11/9 | 2001-04-01 |
| Nikkor | 500mm | f/4 | FX | G ED VR | Yes | | Prime | 4 m (13 ft) | 1:6.9 | 52 mm | 139.5 mm (5.49 in) | 391 mm (15.4 in) | 3,880 g (137 oz) | 14/11 | 2007-08-23 |
| Nikkor | 500mm | f/4 | FX | G VR IF-ED | Yes | | Prime | 3.6 m (12 ft) | 1:6.7 | 40.5 mm | 140 mm (5.5 in) | 387 mm (15.2 in) | 3,090 g (109 oz) | 16/12 | 2015-07-02 |
| Nikkor | 500mm | f/5.6 | FX | E PF ED VR | Yes | | Prime | 3 m (9.8 ft) | 1:5.6 | 95 mm | 106 mm (4.2 in) | 237 mm (9.3 in) | 1,460 g (51 oz) | 19/11 | 2018-08-23 |
| Nikkor | 600mm | f/4 | FX | D IF-ED | No | | Prime | 6 m (20 ft) | 1:9 | | 166 mm (6.5 in) | 417 mm (16.4 in) | 6,050 g (213 oz) | 9/7 | 1992-09-01 |
| Nikkor | 600mm | f/4 | FX | D IF-ED | No | | Prime | 6 m (20 ft) | 1:9 | 52 mm | 166 mm (6.5 in) | 445 mm (17.5 in) | 5,900 g (210 oz) | 10/7 | 1996-07-01 |
| Nikkor | 600mm | f/4 | FX | D IF-ED II | No | | Prime | 5.6 m (18 ft) | 1:8.6 | 52 mm | 166 mm (6.5 in) | 430.5 mm (16.95 in) | 4,750 g (168 oz) | 10/7 | 2001-04-01 |
| Nikkor | 600mm | f/4 | FX | G VR IF-ED | Yes | | Prime | 5 m (16 ft) | 1:7.4 | 52 mm | 166 mm (6.5 in) | 445 mm (17.5 in) | 5,080 g (179 oz) | 15/12 | 2007-08-23 |
| Nikkor | 600mm | f/4 | FX | E FL ED VR | Yes | | Prime | 4.4 m (14 ft) | 1:7.1 | 40.5 mm | 166 mm (6.5 in) | 432 mm (17.0 in) | 3,810 g (134 oz) | 16/12 | 2015-07-02 |
| Nikkor | 800mm | f/5.6 | FX | E FL ED VR | Yes | | Prime | 5.9 m (19 ft) | 1:6.7 | 52 mm | 160 mm (6.3 in) | 461 mm (18.1 in) | 4,590 g (162 oz) | 20/13 | 2013-01-29 |
| Sigma | 4.5mm | f/2.8 | DX | EX DC Fisheye HSM | No | | Prime | 0.14 m (0.46 ft) | 1:6 | 72 mm | 76.2 mm (3.00 in) | 77.8 mm (3.06 in) | 470 g (17 oz) | 13/9 | 2007-14-11 |
| Sigma | 10mm | f/2.8 | DX | EX DC Fisheye HSM | No | | Prime | 0.14 m (0.46 ft) | 1:3.3 | | 75.8 mm (2.98 in) | 83.1 mm (3.27 in) | 475 g (16.8 oz) | 12/7 | 2007-14-11 |
| Sigma | 14mm | f/1.8 | FX | DG HSM ART | No | | Prime | 0.27 m (0.89 ft) | 1:9.8 | | 95.4 mm (3.76 in) | 126 mm (5.0 in) | 1,170 g (41 oz) | 16/11 | 2017-02-21 |
| Sigma | 20mm | f/1.4 | FX | DG HSM ART | No | | Prime | 0.27 m (0.89 ft) | 1:7.1 | | 90.7 mm (3.57 in) | 129.75 mm (5.108 in) | 950 g (34 oz) | 15/11 | 2015-10-16 |
| Sigma | 24mm | f/1.4 | FX | DG HSM ART | No | | Prime | 0.25 m (0.82 ft) | 1:5.3 | 77 mm | 85 mm (3.3 in) | 90.2 mm (3.55 in) | 665 g (23.5 oz) | 15/11 | 2015-02-10 |
| Sigma | 28mm | f/1.4 | FX | DG HSM ART | No | | Prime | 0.28 m (0.92 ft) | 1:5.4 | 77 mm | 82.8 mm (3.26 in) | 107.7 mm (4.24 in) | 865 g (30.5 oz) | 17/12 | 2018-09-25 |
| Sigma | 30mm | f/1.4 | DX | DC HSM ART | No | | Prime | 0.3 m (0.98 ft) | 1:6.8 | 62 mm | 74.2 mm (2.92 in) | 63.3 mm (2.49 in) | 435 g (15.3 oz) | 16/9 | 2013-01-29 |
| Sigma | 35mm | f/1.4 | FX | DG HSM ART | No | | Prime | 0.3 m (0.98 ft) | 1:5.2 | 67 mm | 77 mm (3.0 in) | 94 mm (3.7 in) | 665 g (23.5 oz) | 13/11 | 2012-09-17 |
| Sigma | 40mm | f/1.4 | FX | DG HSM ART | No | | Prime | 0.4 m (1.3 ft) | 1:6.5 | 82 mm | 87.8 mm (3.46 in) | 131 mm (5.2 in) | 1,200 g (42 oz) | 16/12 | 2018-09-25 |
| Sigma | 50mm | f/1.4 | FX | EX DG HSM | No | | Prime | 0.45 m (1.5 ft) | 1:7.4 | 77 mm | 84.5 mm (3.33 in) | 68.2 mm (2.69 in) | 505 g (17.8 oz) | 8/6 | 2008-03-18 |
| Sigma | 50mm | f/1.4 | FX | DG HSM ART | No | | Prime | 0.4 m (1.3 ft) | 1:5.6 | 77 mm | 85.4 mm (3.36 in) | 99.9 mm (3.93 in) | 815 g (28.7 oz) | 13/8 | 2014-01-06 |
| Sigma | 85mm | f/1.4 | FX | EX DG HSM | No | | Prime | 0.85 m (2.8 ft) | 1:8.6 | 77 mm | 86.4 mm (3.40 in) | 87.6 mm (3.45 in) | 725 g (25.6 oz) | 11/8 | 2010-02-21 |
| Sigma | 85mm | f/1.4 | FX | DG HSM ART | No | | Prime | 0.85 m (2.8 ft) | 1:8.5 | 86 mm | 94.7 mm (3.73 in) | 126.2 mm (4.97 in) | 1,130 g (40 oz) | 14/12 | 2016-09-19 |
| Sigma | 105mm | f/1.4 | FX | DG HSM ART | No | | Prime | 1 m (3.3 ft) | 1:8.3 | 105 mm | 115.9 mm (4.56 in) | 131.5 mm (5.18 in) | 1,645 g (58.0 oz) | 17/12 | 2018-02-27 |
| Sigma | 105mm | f/2.8 | FX | EX DG OS HSM MACRO | Yes | | Prime | 0.312 m (1.02 ft) | 1:1 | 62 mm | 78.3 mm (3.08 in) | 126.4 mm (4.98 in) | 725 g (25.6 oz) | 16/11 | 2011-02-08 |
| Sigma | 135mm | f/1.8 | FX | DG HSM ART | No | | Prime | 0.8 m (2.6 ft) | 1:6 | 82 mm | 91.4 mm (3.60 in) | 114.9 mm (4.52 in) | 1,130 g (40 oz) | 16/9 | 2017-02-21 |

== See also ==
- Camera lens
- Lenses for SLR and DSLR cameras
- Photographic lens design
- Fixed focal length/prime lens
- Wide-angle lens
- Telephoto lens
- Macro lens

== External links / reviews ==
- DxOMark Camera Lens Ratings Camera Lens Reviews, Ratings and database (needs Flash)
- Nikon Lens Tests and Reviews Slrgear.com
- All tests/reviews Photozone
- Nikon F-mount lens reviews Lenstip
- Lens Reviews Dpreview
- Interchangeable Lenses Photography Equipment Reviews ePHOTOzine
- Nikon focal length simulator Nikon; needs Flash
- Nikon Lenses Reviews and Advise Any Shot Pro

| Sensor | Class | 1999 | 2000 | 2001 | 2002 | 2003 | 2004 | 2005 | 2006 | 2007 | 2008 | 2009 | 2010 | 2011 | 2012 | 2013 | 2014 | 2015 | 2016 | 2017 | 2018 | 2019 | 2020 | 2021 | 2022 | 2023 | 2024 | 2025 | 2026 |
|---|---|---|---|---|---|---|---|---|---|---|---|---|---|---|---|---|---|---|---|---|---|---|---|---|---|---|---|---|---|
| FX (Full-frame) | Flagship | | | | | | | | | | | D3X ^{−P} | | | | | | | | | | | | | | | | | |
| FX (Full-frame) | Flagship | | | | | | | | | | D3 ^{−P} | | D3S ^{−P} | | D4 | | D4S | | D5^{T} | | | | | D6^{T} | | | | | |
| FX (Full-frame) | Professional | | | | | | | | | | | D700 ^{−P} | | | D800/D800E | | | D810/D810A | | | D850 ^{AT} | | | | | | | | |
| FX (Full-frame) | Enthusiast | | | | | | | | | | | | | | | | Df | | | | | | | | | | | | |
| FX (Full-frame) | Enthusiast | | | | | | | | | | | | | | | | | D750 ^{A} | | | | | D780 ^{AT} | | | | | | |
| FX (Full-frame) | Enthusiast | | | | | | | | | | | | | | | D600 | D610 | | | | | | | | | | | | |
| DX (APS-C) | Flagship | | D1^{−E} | D1X^{−E} | | | | D2X^{−E} | | D2Xs^{−E} | | | | | | | | | | | | | | | | | | | |
| DX (APS-C) | Flagship | | D1^{−E} | D1H ^{−E} | | | D2H^{−E} | D2Hs^{−E} | | | | | | | | | | | | | | | | | | | | | |
| DX (APS-C) | Professional | | | | D100^{−E} | | | | D200^{−E} | | D300^{−P} | | D300S^{−P} | | | | | | D500 ^{AT} | | | | | | | | | | |
| DX (APS-C) | Enthusiast | | | | | | D70^{−E} | | D70s^{−E} | D80^{−E} | | D90^{−E} | | D7000 ^{−P} | | | D7100 | D7200 | | | D7500 ^{AT} | | | | | | | | |
| DX (APS-C) | Upper-entry | | | | | | | | D50^{−E} | D40X^{−E*} | D60^{−E*} | | D5000^{A−P*} | | D5100^{A−P*} | D5200^{A−P*} | D5300^{A*} | D5500^{AT*} | | D5600 ^{AT*} | | | | | | | | | |
| DX (APS-C) | Entry-level | | | | | | | | | D40^{−E*} | | | D3000^{−E*} | D3100^{−P*} | | D3200^{−P*} | D3300^{*} | | | D3400^{*} | | D3500^{*} | | | | | | | |
| Early models | | SVC (prototype; 1986); QV-1000C (1988); NASA F4 (1991); E2/E2S (1995); E2N/E2NS (1996); E3/E3S (1998) | | | | | | | | | | | | | | | | | | | | | | | | | | | |
| Sensor | Class | | | | | | | | | | | | | | | | | | | | | | | | | | | | |
| Sensor | Class | 1999 | 2000 | 2001 | 2002 | 2003 | 2004 | 2005 | 2006 | 2007 | 2008 | 2009 | 2010 | 2011 | 2012 | 2013 | 2014 | 2015 | 2016 | 2017 | 2018 | 2019 | 2020 | 2021 | 2022 | 2023 | 2024 | 2025 | 2026 |
