= Nikon AF-S DX Zoom-Nikkor 10-24mm f/3.5-4.5G ED =

AF-S DX Zoom-Nikkor 10-24mm f/3.5–4.5G ED
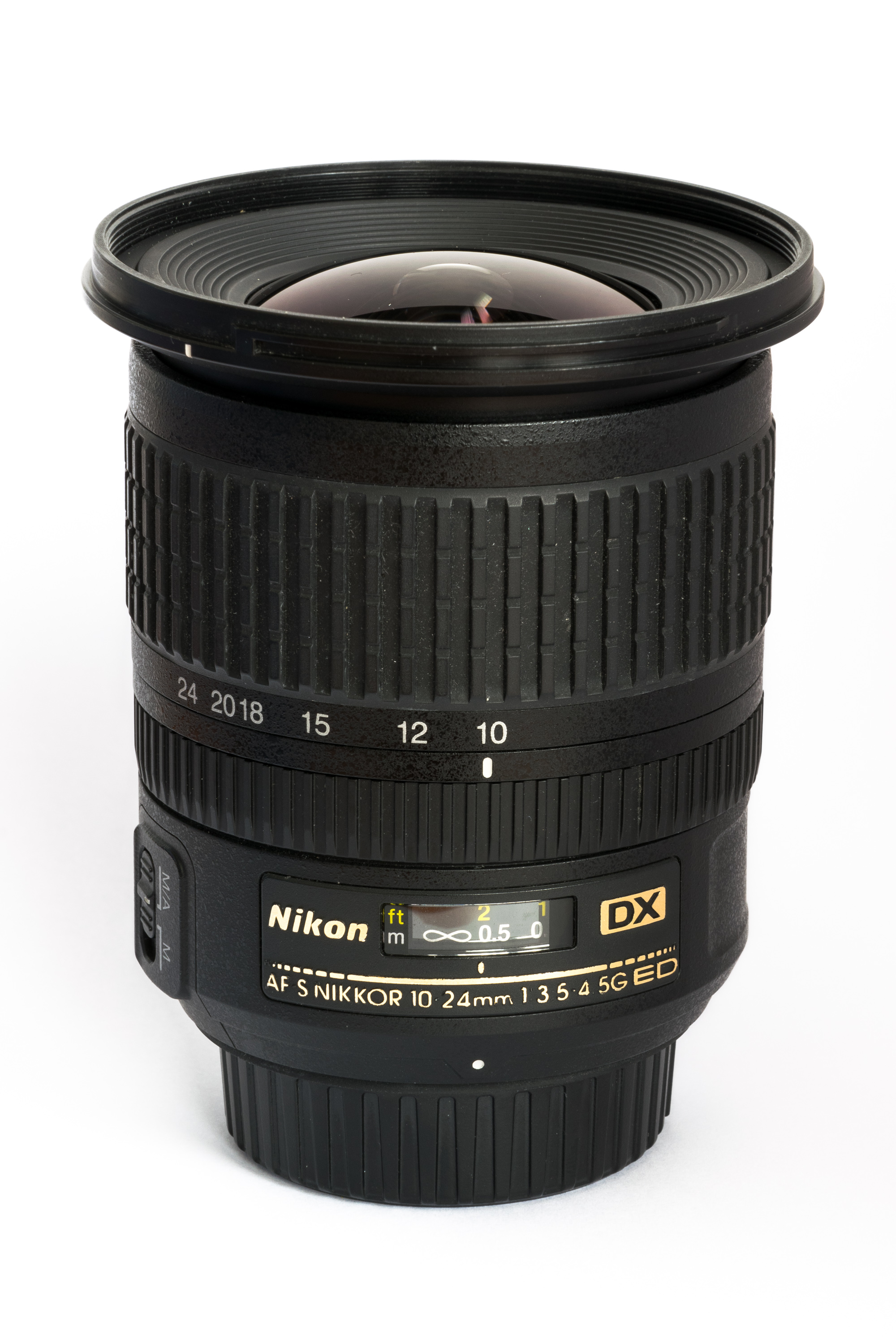
- Maker: Nikon
- Lens mount: F-mount

Technical data
- Type: Zoom
- Focus drive: Silent wave motor
- Focal length: 10-24mm
- Focal length (35mm equiv.): 15-36mm
- Image format: DX (APS-C)
- Aperture (max/min): f/3.5–22 (wide) f/4.5–29 (tele)
- Close focus distance: 0.24 m in AF mode 0.22 m in MF mode
- Max. magnification: 1:5
- Diaphragm blades: 7 (rounded)
- Construction: 14 elements in 9 groups

Features
- Lens-based stabilization: No No
- Macro capable: No No
- Aperture ring: No No
- Application: Wide-angle zoom

Physical
- Max. length: 87 mm
- Diameter: 82.5mm
- Weight: 460g
- Filter diameter: 77mm

Accessories
- Lens hood: HB-23
- Case: CL-1118

Angle of view
- Diagonal: 109°-61° (with DX format)

History
- Introduction: May 2009

Retail info
- MSRP: 899.95 (release) USD

The AF-S DX Zoom-Nikkor 10-24mm f/3.5–4.5G ED is a lens manufactured by Nikon for use on Nikon DX format digital SLR cameras. It provides an angle of view on a DX format camera similar to that of a 15-36mm lens on a 135 film format camera.

== Introduction ==
Nikon announced the lens on 14 April 2009, its predecessor was the Nikon AF-S DX Zoom-Nikkor 12-24mm f/4G IF-ED.

== Features ==
- 10-24mm focal length (approximately equivalent to a 15-36mm lens used on a 135 film format camera)
- Compact silent-wave autofocus motor (SWM) with full-time manual override
- Nikon F-mount lens exclusively for use with Nikon DX format DSLRs
- Extra-low Dispersion (ED) glass elements to reduce chromatic aberration
- Aspherical elements to reduce distortion
- Super integrated coating (SIC) to reduce flare and ghosts
- Internal focusing (IF)

== Construction ==
- fourteen lens elements in seven groups
- three aspherical elements
- two ED glass elements

== See also ==
- List of Nikon compatible lenses with integrated autofocus-motor
