= Nikon AF-S DX Zoom-Nikkor 16-85mm f/3.5-5.6G IF-ED VR =

AF-S DX 16-85mm f/3.5–5.6G IF-ED VR
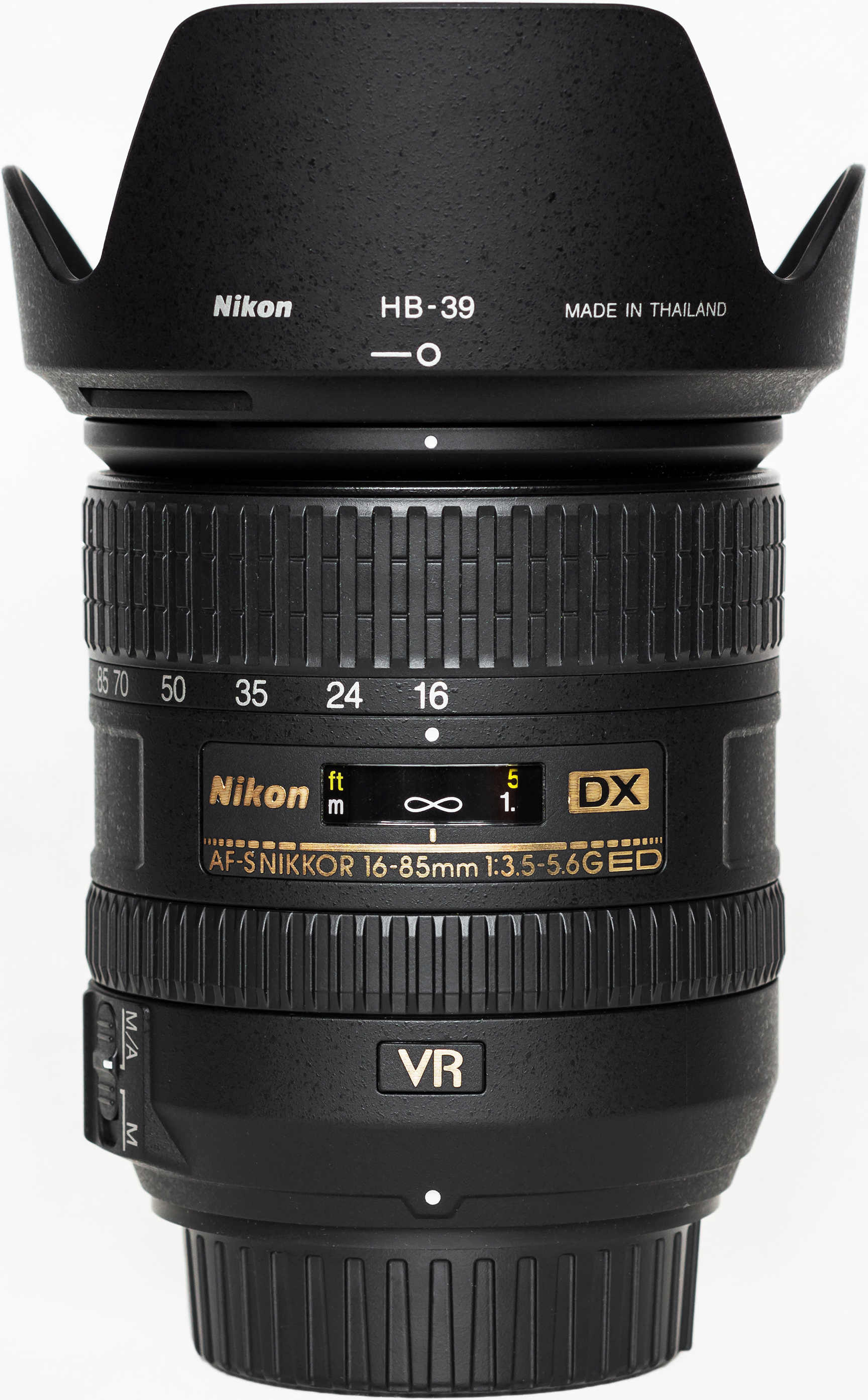
- Maker: Nikon
- Lens mount(s): F-mount

Technical data
- Type: Zoom
- Focal length: 16–85 mm
- Focal length (35mm equiv.): 24–127.5 mm
- Crop factor: 1.5
- Aperture (max/min): f/3.5–22 (wide) f/5.6–36 (tele)
- Close focus distance: 1.3 ft. (.38 m)
- Max. magnification: 1:4.6
- Construction: 17 elements in 11 groups

Features
- Short back focus: No No
- Ultrasonic motor: Yes Yes
- Lens-based stabilization: Yes Yes
- Macro capable: No No
- Application: Standard zoom

Physical
- Max. length: 85 mm
- Diameter: 72 mm
- Weight: 420 g
- Filter diameter: 67 mm

Accessories
- Lens hood: HB-39
- Case: CL-1015

The Nikon AF-S DX Zoom-Nikkor 16-85mm f/3.5–5.6G IF-ED VR is a wide to medium telephoto zoom lens produced by Nikon Corporation for its Nikon DX format digital SLR cameras.

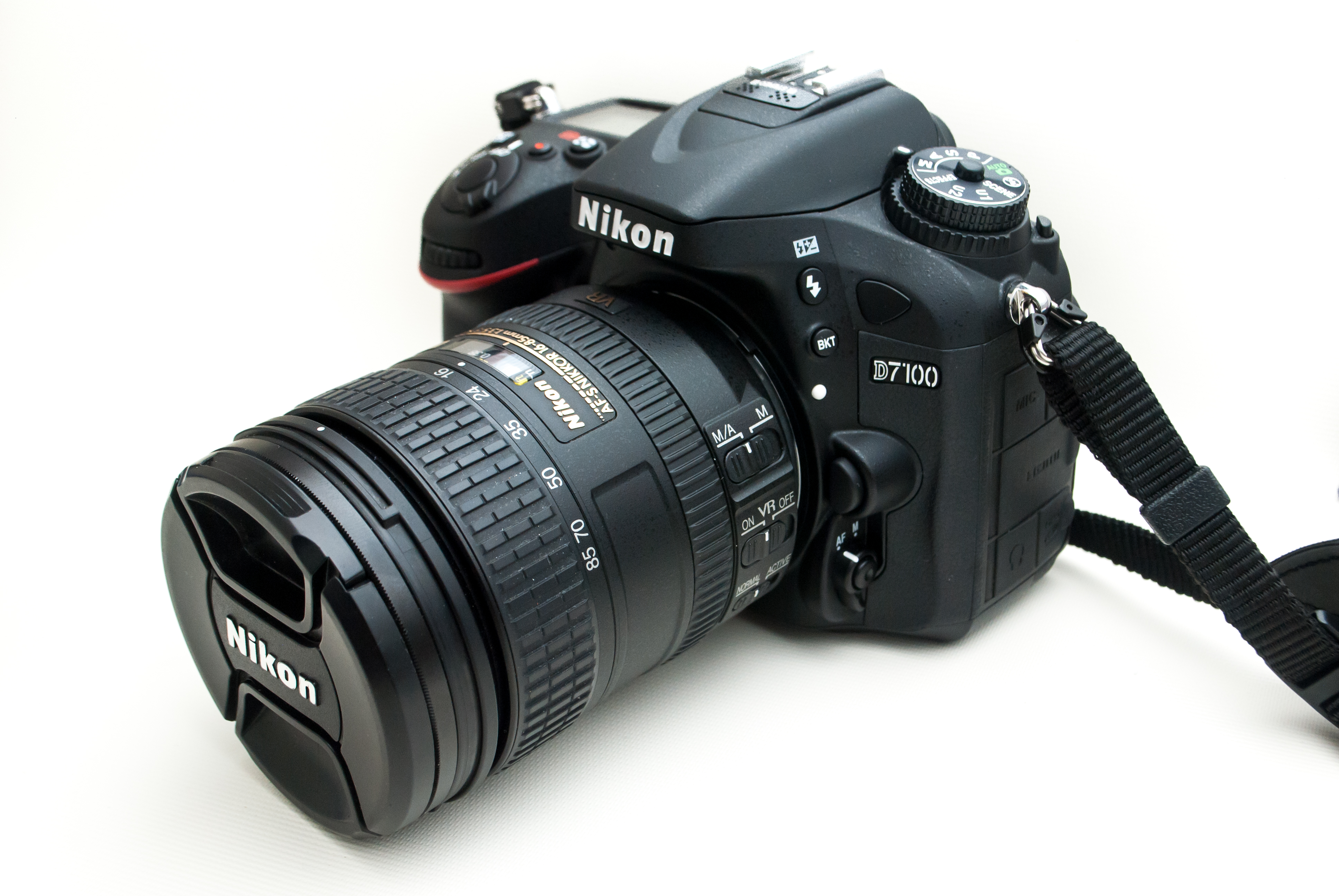
Mounted on a Nikon D7100

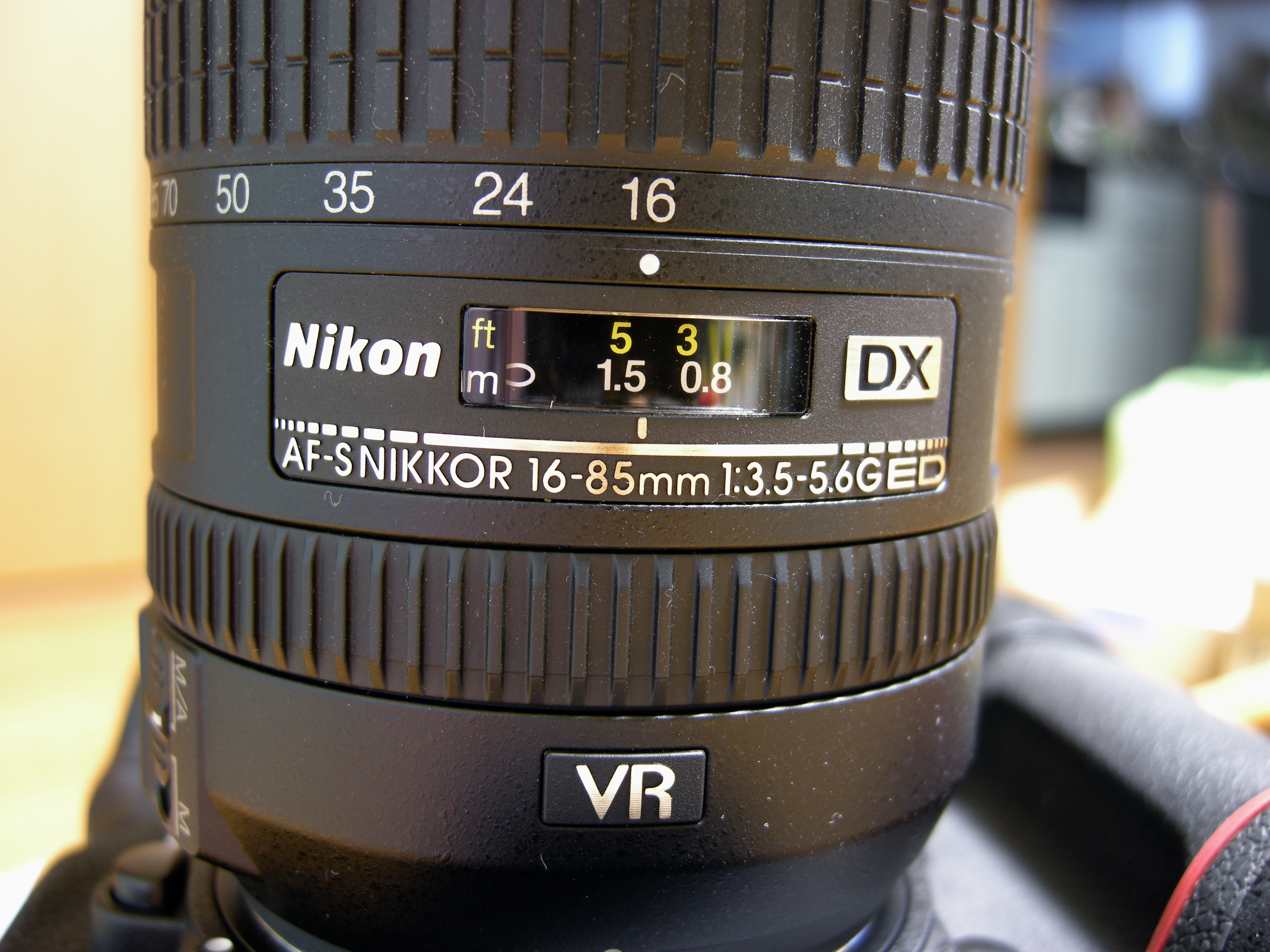
Close-up of the lens' badge and focus distance window

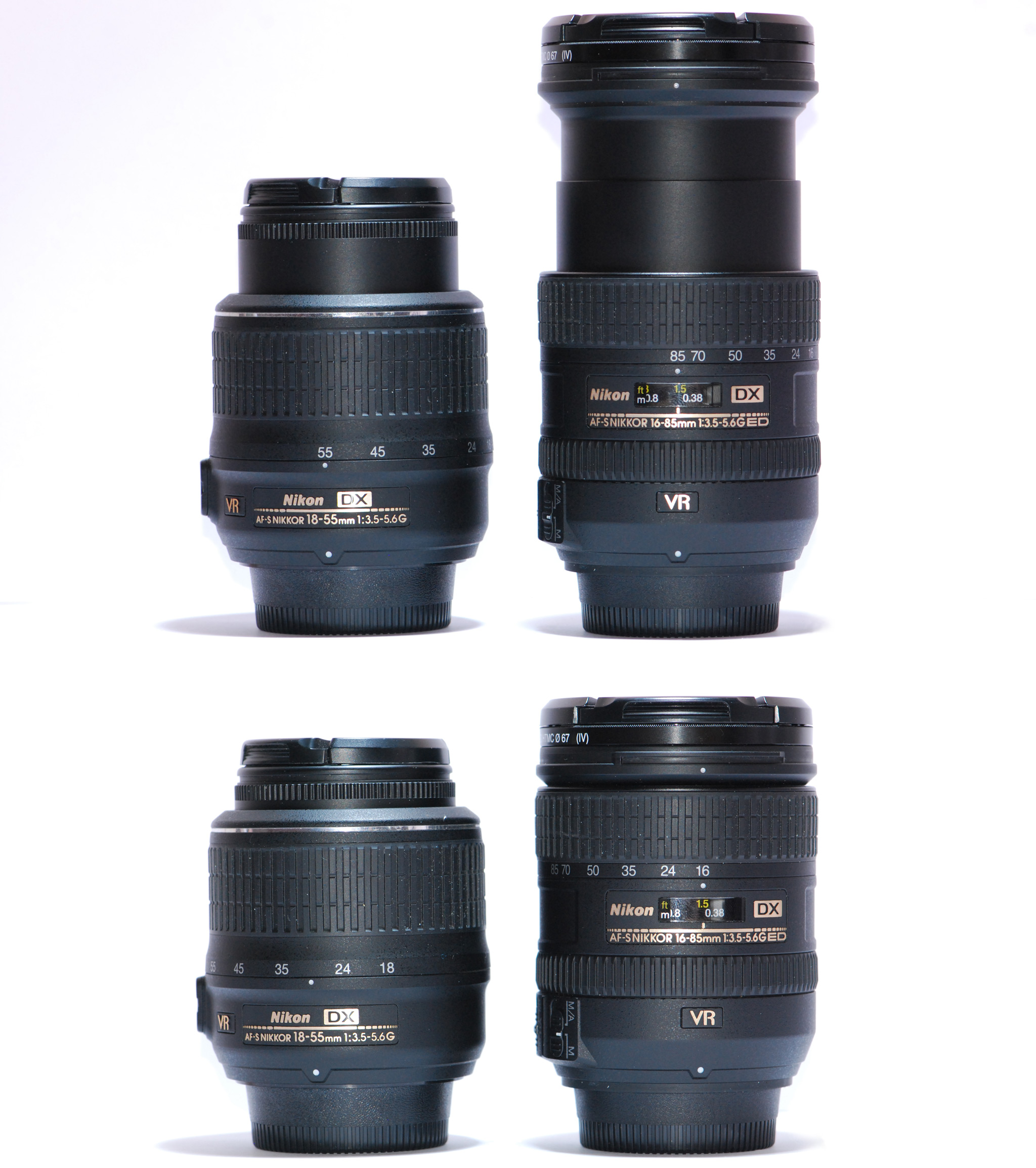
Comparison between the lens and AF-S 18-55mm f/3.5-5.6G VR

== See also ==
- List of Nikon compatible lenses with integrated autofocus-motor
