= Nikon AF-S Zoom-Nikkor 17-35mm f/2.8D ED-IF =

AF-S Zoom-Nikkor 17-35mm f/2.8D IF-ED
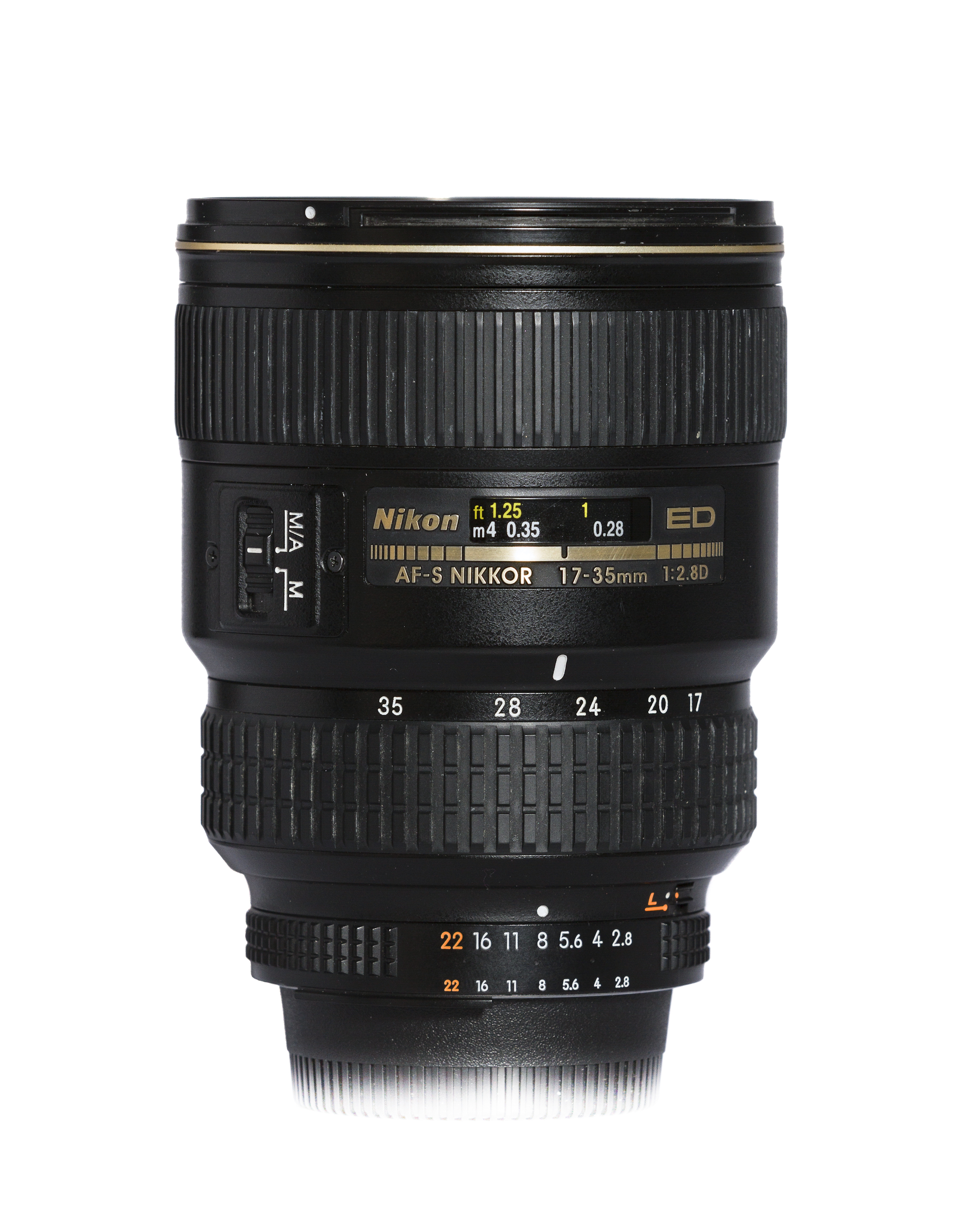
- Maker: Nikon
- Lens mount: F-mount

Technical data
- Type: Zoom
- Focus drive: Silent wave motor
- Focal length: 17-35mm
- Image format: FX (full-frame)
- Aperture (max/min): f/2.8 - f/22
- Close focus distance: 0.28m
- Max. magnification: 1:4.6
- Diaphragm blades: 9 (rounded)
- Construction: 13 elements in 10 groups

Features
- Lens-based stabilization: No No
- Macro capable: No No
- Aperture ring: Yes Yes
- Application: ultra-wideangle zoom

Physical
- Max. length: 106mm
- Diameter: 82.5mm
- Weight: 745g
- Filter diameter: 77mm

Accessories
- Lens hood: HB-23
- Case: CL-76

Angle of view
- Diagonal: 104° - 62°

History
- Introduction: 1999

Retail info
- MSRP: 1500.00 USD

The 17-35mm f/2.8D ED-IF AF-S Nikkor is an F-mount zoom lens manufactured and sold by Nikon. For 35mm format cameras, this lens covers a wide-angle range, and is well known as a photojournalists' lens. For Nikon DX format cameras, this lens covers a wide-to-normal range.

It is generally considered to be one of the finest zoom lenses ever produced, comparing favorably with many wide-angle prime Nikkor lenses. As of 2006, Photozone.de ranks the lens in 4th place among all Nikkors both prime and zoom, and in first place among all zoom lenses by any manufacturer.

It replaces the older AF Zoom-Nikkor 20-35mm f/2.8 IF lens.

== See also ==
- List of Nikon F-mount lenses with integrated autofocus motor
