= Sigma 180mm f/3.5 EX DG lens =

Sigma 180mm F3.5 APO MACRO DG EX HSM
- Maker: Sigma

Technical data
- Type: Telephoto/macro
- Focal length: 180mm
- Crop factor: 1.0
- Aperture (max/min): f/3.5-f/32
- Close focus distance: 46cm
- Max. magnification: 1:1
- Diaphragm blades: 9
- Construction: 13 elements in 10 groups

Features
- Short back focus: No No
- Ultrasonic motor: Yes Yes
- Lens-based stabilization: No No
- Macro capable: Yes Yes

Physical
- Max. length: 182mm
- Diameter: 80mm
- Weight: 965g
- Filter diameter: 72mm

Retail info
- MSRP: 1534 USD

The Sigma APO 180mm F3.5 EX DG lens was a telephoto/macro lens produced by Sigma Corporation. It contained two SLD (Special Low Dispersion) glass elements to provide correction for chromatic aberration and was aimed toward advanced consumers.

It was designed for use on full frame Digital SLR cameras, but can also be fitted to DSLRs with smaller APS-C size sensors, where it covers a similar field of view to a 270mm lens when fitted to Nikon, Pentax and Sony cameras with 1.5x crop factors or 288mm with Canon DSLRs. It was replaced by the Sigma APO 180mm F2.8 EX DG HSM OS Macro lens in 2012.

The 180mm macro lens has the EX (‘Excellence’) matte finish on the lens barrel and supplied cylindrical hood and comes with the same DG (‘digital’) coatings that minimize the effects of internal reflections off the surface of the sensor. It’s significantly larger than the 105mm lens and has some features that lens lacks.

The lens came with a 90 mm long cylindrical lens hood attached with a bayonet mount on the front of the barrel. It could be reversed over the barrel for storage or carrying. The lens cap could be fitted with the hood in either position.

Also supplied with the lens was a removable tripod collar with a screw nut that enables the camera body to be rotated between horizontal and vertical positions without requiring the lens to be detached from the tripod.

== See also ==
- List of Nikon compatible lenses with integrated autofocus-motor
