= Nikon AF-S 17-55mm f/2.8 G IF-ED DX =

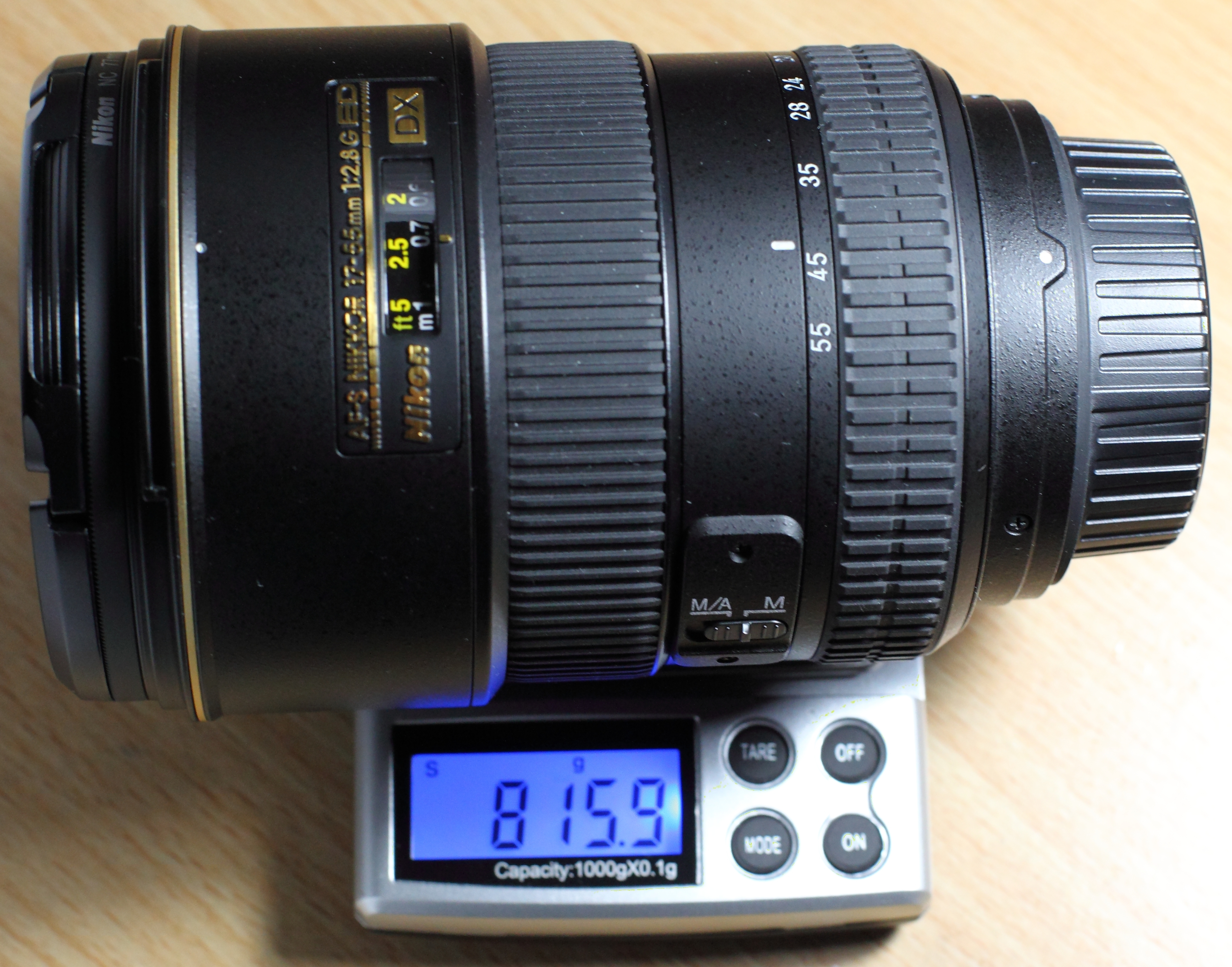
Nikon AF-S 17-55mm f2.8 G IF-ED DX

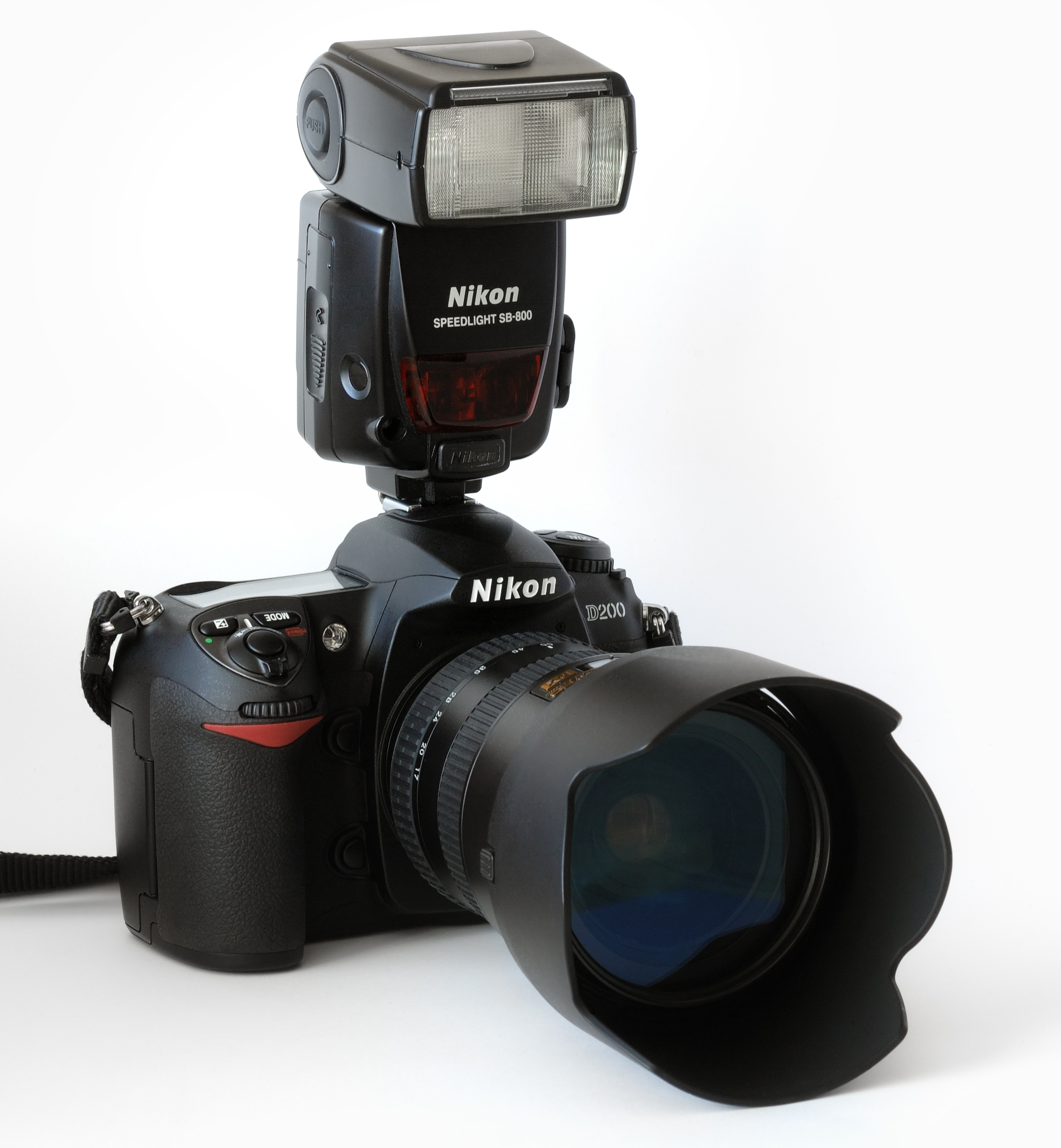
The lens mounted on a Nikon D200

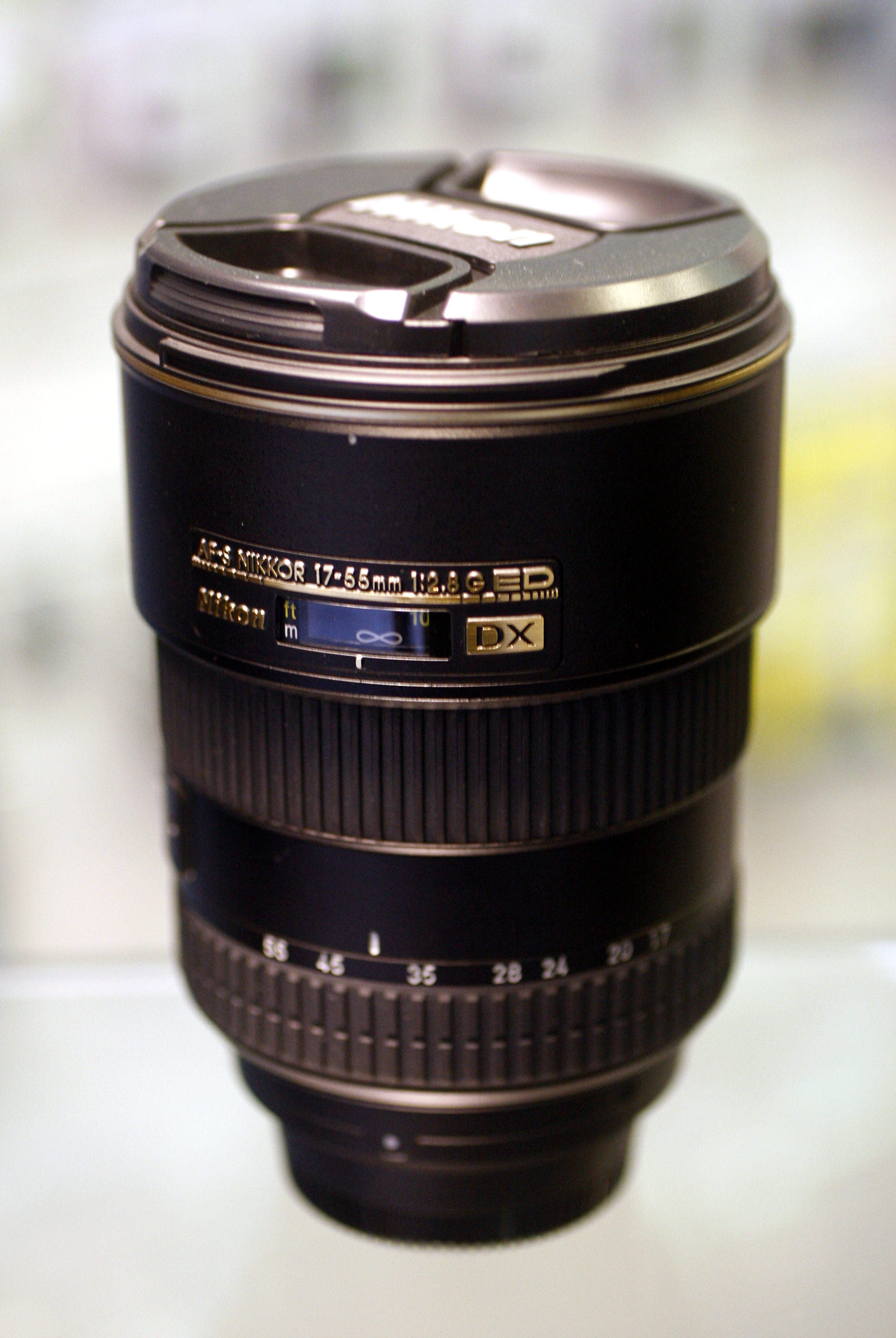

The Nikon AF-S Nikkor 17-55mm f/2.8 G IF-ED DX was announced in 2004. It is a F-mount professional zoom lens with a constant fast aperture of f/2.8 designed for Nikon DX digital SLR cameras. Nikon have incorporated their Silent Wave Motor for silent auto focusing. The lens is made mostly of metal and the rubber sealed rear mount makes the lens partially dust and water resistant. Dimensions of the lens are 85.5 x 110.5mm. The filter size is 77mm and the lens weighs 755g.

It is now discontinued.

== Specifications ==
AF	Yes Yes			
Mount Type	Nikon F-Bayonet			
Focal Length Range	17-55mm			
Maximum aperture	f/2.8			
Minimum aperture	f/22			
Weight	755g			
Dimensions (Approx.)	85.5 x 110.5mm (Diameter x Length)			
Diaphragm Blades	9			
Filter diameter	77mm			
Maximum Angle of View	(DX-format) 79°°			
Minimum Angle of View	(DX-format) 28°50'			
Maximum Reproduction Ratio	0.20x			
Lens Elements	14			
Lens Groups	10			
Compatible Format(s)	DX		FX in DX Crop Mode	
Super Integrated Coating	Yes			
ED Glass Elements	3			
Aspherical Elements	3			
Distance Information	Yes			
AF-S (Silent Wave Motor)	Yes			
Internal Focusing	Yes			
Minimum Focus Distance	1.2 ft. (0.36m)			
Supplied Accessories	HB-31 Hood	CL-1120 Case	77mm lens cap	Rear lens cap
RRP - 2013	$1,539.95			

== See also ==
- List of Nikon compatible lenses with integrated autofocus-motor
- Nikon DX format
