= Nikon AF-S NIKKOR 24–70 mm 1:2,8G ED =

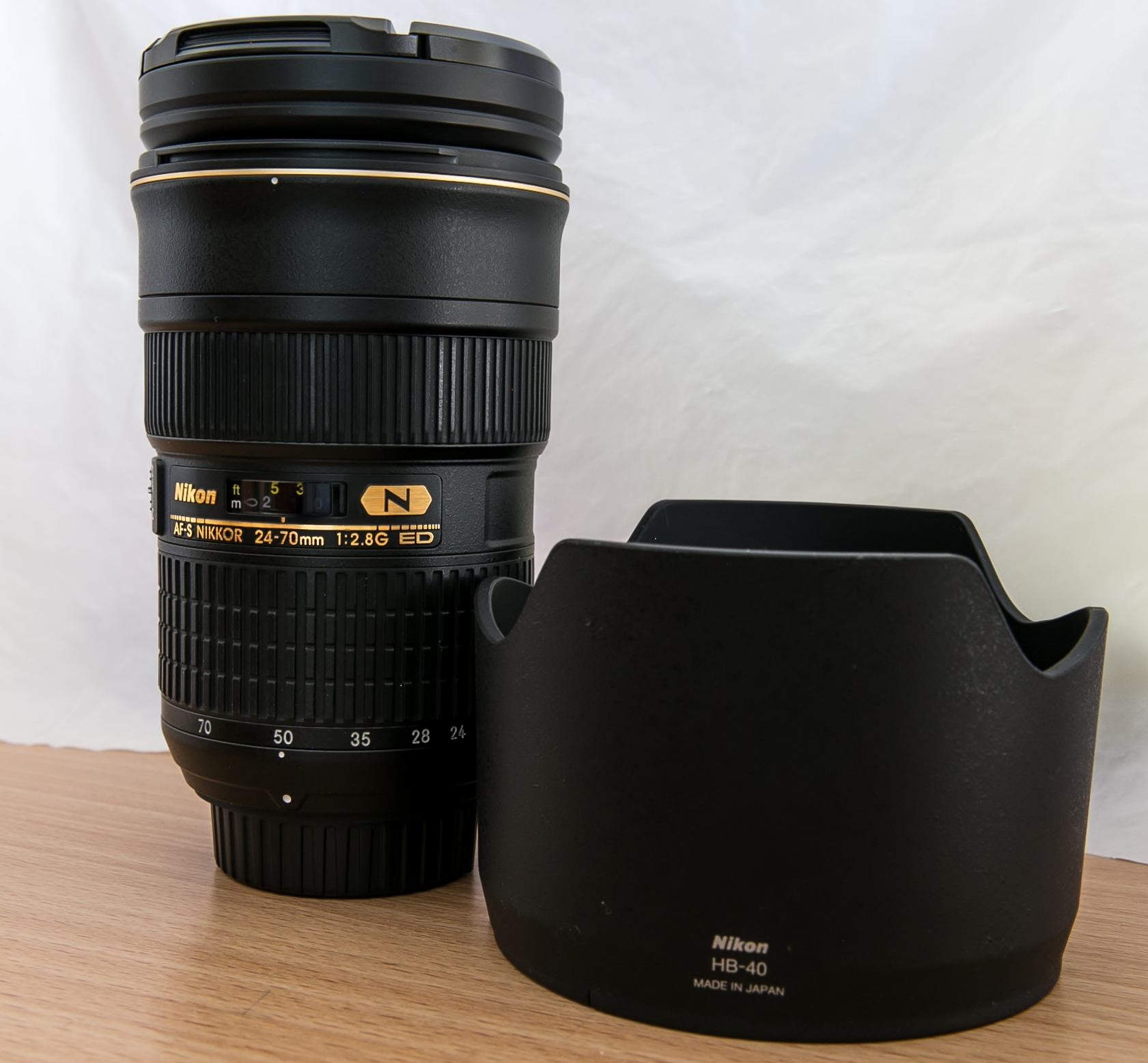
Nikon AF-S 24-70mm f-2.8G ED

The Nikon 24-70mm f/2.8G ED AF-S lens was announced in 2007 by Nikon, in Japan. It is a dust- and moisture-resistant professional wide-angle to short-telephoto high-performance zoom, featuring internal focusing with constant aperture of f/2.8 throughout the focal range, closest focusing distance of 0.38 m/0.9 ft with a filter size of 77 mm and a Silent Wave Motor for quiet auto-focusing. It is not a small or light lens – its dimensions are 83 × 133 mm and it weighs in at approximately 900 g.

== Specifications ==
AF	Yes Yes			
Maximum aperture	f/2.8			
Minimum aperture	f/22			
Weight	900g			
Dimensions (Approx.)	3.3in (83mm) × 5.2in (133mm) Diameter × Length			
Diaphragm Blades	9			
Filter diameter	77mm			
Maximum Angle of View	(FX-format) 84° (DX-format) 61°			
Minimum Angle of View	(FX-format) 34°20' (DX-format) 22°50'			
Maximum Reproduction Ratio	0.27x			
Lens Elements	15			
Lens Groups	11			
Compatible Format(s)	FX	DX	FX in DX Crop Mode	35mm Film
Nano Crystal Coat	Yes			
ED Glass Elements	3			
Aspherical Elements	3			
Super Integrated Coating	Yes			
AF-S (Silent Wave Motor)	Yes			
Internal Focusing	Yes			
Minimum Focus Distance	1.2 ft. (0.38m)			
Supplied Accessories	LC-77 77m snap-on front lens cap	LF-1 rear lens cap	HB-40 Bayonet Hood	CL-M3 Semi-soft Case
RRP - 2013	$1,889.95			

== See also ==
- List of Nikon compatible lenses with integrated autofocus-motor
- Nikkor
- Nikon F-mount
