= Nikon AF-S Zoom-Nikkor 24-120mm f/3.5-5.6G IF-ED VR =

AF-S Zoom-Nikkor 24-120mm f/3.5-5.6G IF-ED VR
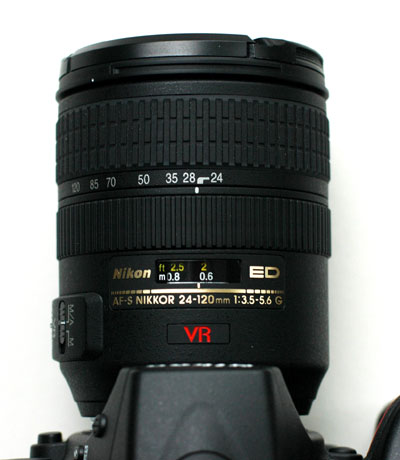
- Maker: Nikon
- Lens mount(s): F-mount

Technical data
- Type: Zoom
- Focus drive: Silent wave motor
- Focal length: 24-120mm
- Image format: FX (full-frame)
- Aperture (max/min): f/3.5-5.6 - f/22
- Close focus distance: 1.6 ft. (0.5m)
- Max. magnification: 1:4.8
- Diaphragm blades: 7 (rounded)
- Construction: 15 elements in 13 groups

Features
- Lens-based stabilization: Yes Yes
- Macro capable: No No
- Aperture ring: No No
- Application: Standard zoom

Physical
- Max. length: 94mm
- Diameter: 77mm
- Weight: 420g
- Filter diameter: 72mm

Accessories
- Lens hood: HB-25
- Case: CL-S2

The Nikon AF-S Zoom-Nikkor 24-120mm f/3.5-5.6G IF-ED VR is a standard zoom lens produced by Nikon Corporation. These are commonly sold as the kit lens for the Nikon D700. It contains two ED glass elements.

== See also ==
- List of Nikon compatible lenses with integrated autofocus-motor
