= Nikon AF-S DX Zoom-Nikkor 18-300mm f/3.5-5.6G ED VR =

AF-S DX Nikkor-Zoom 18-300mm f/3.5–5.6G ED VR
- Maker: Nikon
- Lens mount: F-mount

Technical data
- Type: Zoom
- Focal length: 18 - 300 mm
- Focal length (35mm equiv.): 27 - 450 mm
- Crop factor: 1.5
- Aperture (max/min): f/3.5–22 (wide) f/5.6–32 (tele)
- Close focus distance: 0.45 m/1.48 ft.
- Max. magnification: 1/16.7
- Diaphragm blades: 9 (rounded)
- Construction: 19 elements in 14 groups

Features
- Short back focus: No No
- Ultrasonic motor: Yes Yes
- Lens-based stabilization: Yes Yes
- Macro capable: No No
- Unique features: 3 Extra-low Dispersion (ED) elements 3 Aspherical elements Super Integrated Coating; Internal Focusing
- Application: Wide (DX relative); Standard (DX relative); Telephoto superzoom (DX relative)

Physical
- Min. length: 120 mm/4.7 in.
- Diameter: 83 mm/3.3 in.
- Weight: 830 g/29.3 oz.
- Filter diameter: 77 mm screw-on

Accessories
- Lens hood: HB-58 (bayonet) (supplied with lens)
- Case: CL-1120 (soft case) (supplied with lens)

Angle of view
- Diagonal: 76˚ - 5˚20'

History
- Introduction: June 2012

Retail info
- MSRP: 999.95 USD

The 18-300mm f/3.5–5.6G ED VR (not to be confused with its less-expensive alternative, the 18-300mm f/3.5–6.3G ED VR) is a telephoto superzoom lens manufactured by Nikon for its line of DX DSLR cameras.

Like all DX format lenses, the smaller image circle makes it usable on APS-C-sized image sensors only. If used on a 35mm film SLR or older FX DSLRs, vignetting will occur; however, the lens can be used on a modern FX DSLR because the camera can be automatically or manually set to "DX Crop Mode", eliminating vignette, but also reducing the image area from an FX-size sensor to a DX-size sensor.

Much like its counterpart, the lens is designed to be an all-in-one solution to eliminate a photographer's need to change lenses in different scenarios and reduce the amount of gear the photographer needs to carry. The main differences from the f/3.5–6.3G are its heavier (830 g/29.3 oz. vs. 550 g/19.4 oz.), larger (length 120 mm/4.7 in. vs. 99 mm/3.8 in.) (diameter 83 mm/3.3 in. vs. 78.5 mm/3.0 in.), it takes larger filters (77 mm vs. 67 mm), and its aperture is slightly faster (5.6 vs. 6.3).

The lens (and the f/3.5–6.3G, since it has the same focal length) has the largest zoom range of any other lens (interchangeable camera lenses only) currently manufactured.

== Features ==
The lens is equipped with the following features:

Nikon's Silent Wave Motor for quick and almost completely silent autofocus operation (denotes the "AF-S" on the lens body).

VR II for image stabilization and has two stabilization modes for different conditions (denotes the "VR" on the lens body).

Nikon's Extra-low Dispersion (ED) glass to remove chromatic aberrations (denotes the "ED" on the lens body).

Aspherical elements to remove other kinds of aberrations that may occur.

Lens elements are made with Nikon's multiple layer Super Integrated Coating (SIC) for improved color in photographs as well as reducing ghosting and flaring.

Nikon's Internal Focusing (IF) to prevent the lens from changing size during focusing operation.

== Specifications ==
Reproduction ratio	0.32x
Rangefinder	Yes (built-in focus distance scale and shown in camera viewfinder and display)
Formats	DX; FX in "DX Crop Mode"
Lens type	G
Focus	Automatic; Manual; Automatic with manual override
