= Tamron SP 45mm f/1.8 Di VC USD =

- Maker: Tamron
- Lens mount(s): Canon EF, Nikon F (FX), Sony/Minolta Alpha

Technical data
- Type: Prime
- Focus drive: Ring-type ultrasonic
- Close focus distance: 0.29 metres (0.95 ft)
- Max. magnification: 0.3
- Diaphragm blades: 9
- Construction: 10 elements in 8 groups

Features
- Manual focus override: Yes Yes
- Weather-sealing: Yes Yes
- Lens-based stabilization: Yes Yes
- Aperture ring: No No

Physical
- Max. length: 92 millimetres (3.6 in)
- Diameter: 80 millimetres (3.1 in)
- Weight: 540 grams (1.19 lb)
- Filter diameter: 67mm

History
- Introduction: 2015

The Tamron SP 45mm f/1.8 Di VC USD is an interchangeable standard prime lens for cameras with a full-frame or smaller sensor. On an APS-C camera, its field of view is narrower, so as to be more useful as a short portrait lens. It was announced by Tamron on September 2, 2015.
