= Samyang 12mm F2.8 ED AS NCS Fish-eye =

- Maker: Samyang
- Lens mount(s): Canon EF, Nikon F (FX), Pentax KAF2, Sony/Minolta Alpha, Sony E (NEX)

Technical data
- Type: Prime
- Close focus distance: 0.20 metres (0.66 ft)
- Diaphragm blades: 7
- Construction: 12 elements in 8 groups

Features
- Manual focus override: Yes Yes
- Weather-sealing: No No
- Lens-based stabilization: No No
- Aperture ring: Yes Yes

Physical
- Max. length: 73 millimetres (2.9 in)
- Diameter: 77 millimetres (3.0 in)
- Weight: 515 grams (1.135 lb)

History
- Introduction: 2014

The Samyang 12mm F2.8 ED AS NCS Fish-eye is an interchangeable camera lens announced by Samyang on November 1, 2014.
