= Samyang T-S 24mm f/3.5 ED AS UMC =

Samyang T-S 24mm 1:3.5 ED AS UMC
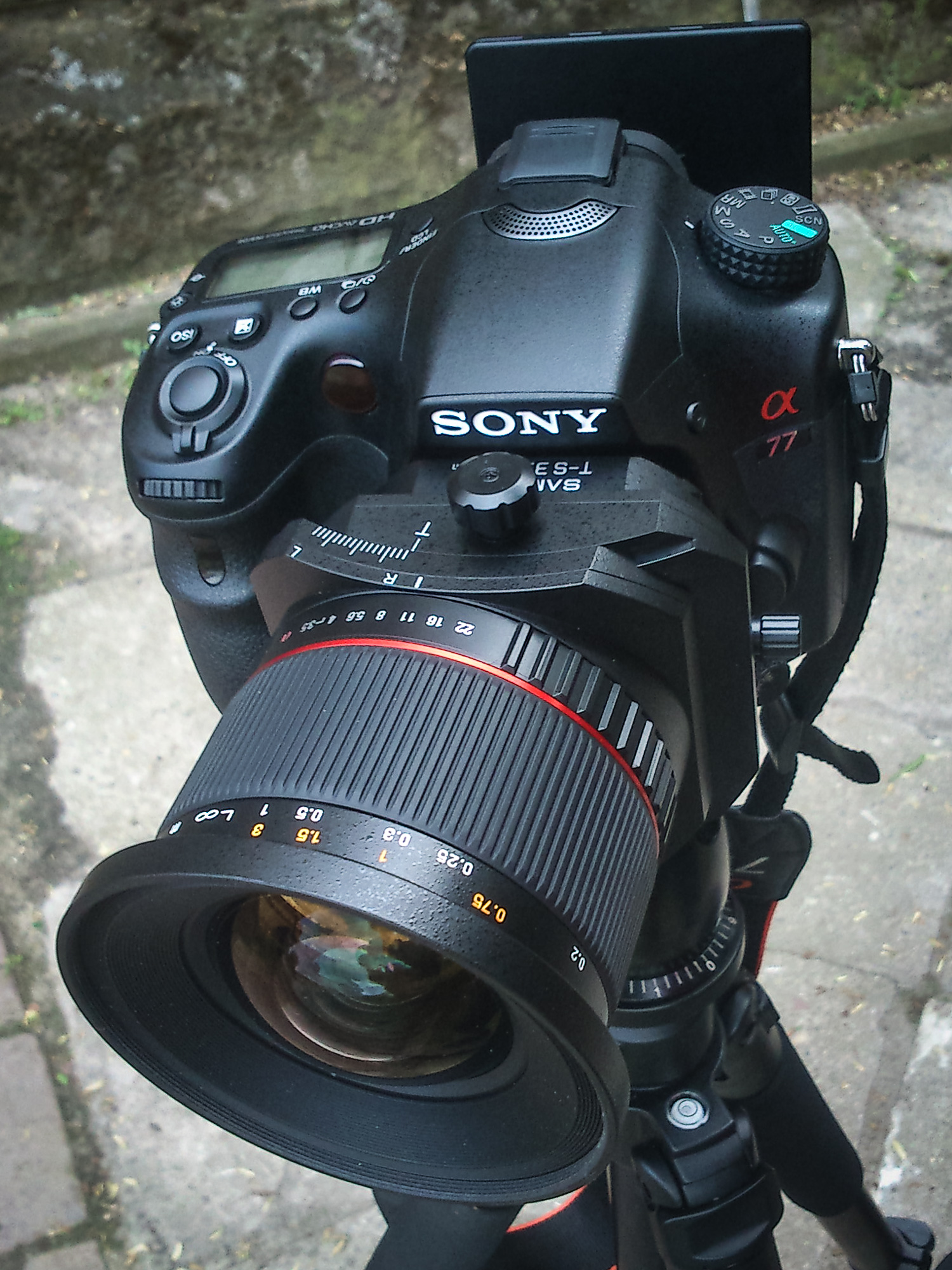
- Maker: Samyang
- Lens mount(s): Canon EF, Nikon F (FX), Pentax KAF, Sony/Minolta Alpha, Sony E (NEX)

Technical data
- Type: Prime
- Focus drive: manual
- Focal length: 24 mm
- Aperture (max/min): f/3.5–f/22
- Close focus distance: 0.20 metres (0.66 ft)
- Diaphragm blades: 8
- Construction: 16 elements in 11 groups

Features
- Manual focus override: No No
- Weather-sealing: No No
- Lens-based stabilization: No No
- Aperture ring: Yes Yes
- Application: landscape, architecture

Physical
- Max. length: 112 mm (4.4 in)
- Diameter: 86 mm (3.4 in)
- Weight: 680 g (1.50 lb)
- Filter diameter: 82 mm

History
- Introduction: 2012

The Samyang T-S 24mm 1:3.5 ED AS UMC is an interchangeable wide angle tilt-shift lens for cameras with a full frame or smaller sensor. It was announced by Samyang on September 7, 2012.
