= Samyang 16mm f/2.0 ED AS UMC CS =

Photographic lens

- Maker: Samyang
- Lens mounts: Canon EF-M, Canon EF-S, Four Thirds, Fujifilm X, Micro Four Thirds, Nikon F (DX), Pentax KAF, Samsung NX, Sony/Minolta Alpha, Sony E (NEX)

Technical data
- Type: Prime
- Focal length: 16mm
- Aperture (max/min): f/2.0
- Close focus distance: 0.20 metres (0.66 ft)
- Diaphragm blades: 8
- Construction: 13 elements in 11 groups

Features
- Manual focus override: No No
- Weather-sealing: No No
- Lens-based stabilization: No No
- Aperture ring: Yes Yes

Physical
- Max. length: 89 millimetres (3.5 in)
- Diameter: 83 millimetres (3.3 in)
- Weight: 583 grams (1.285 lb)
- Filter diameter: 77mm

History
- Introduction: 2013

The Samyang 16mm f/2.0 ED AS UMC CS is an interchangeable camera lens announced by Samyang on June 13, 2013.
