= Samyang 7.5mm F3.5 UMC Fisheye MFT =

- Maker: Samyang Optics
- Lens mount(s): Micro Four Thirds

Technical data
- Type: Prime
- Focus drive: manual
- Focal length: 8 mm
- Aperture (max/min): f/3.5–f/22
- Close focus distance: 0.09 metres (0.30 ft)
- Construction: 9 elements in 7 groups

Features
- Manual focus override: No No
- Weather-sealing: No No
- Lens-based stabilization: No No
- Aperture ring: Yes Yes

Physical
- Max. length: 48 mm (1.9 in)
- Diameter: 60 mm (2.4 in)
- Weight: 197 g (0.434 lb)
- Filter diameter: not possible

Accessories
- Lens hood: Built-in petal-type hood

Angle of view
- Diagonal: 180°

The Samyang 7.5mm F3.5 UMC Fisheye MFT is an interchangeable camera lens by Samyang for Micro Four Thirds systems. It is a manual focus lens.
