= Samyang 8mm F2.8 UMC Fisheye =

- Maker: Samyang
- Lens mount(s): Canon EF, Fuji X, MFT, Samsung NX, Sony E

Technical data
- Type: Prime
- Focal length: 8mm
- Focal length (35mm equiv.): 12 mm (except Canon, 12.8 mm, and MFT, 16 mm)
- Aperture (max/min): f/2.8–f/22
- Close focus distance: 0.30 metres (0.98 ft)
- Max. focus distance: ∞
- Construction: 11 elements in 8 groups

Features
- Manual focus override: No No
- Weather-sealing: No No
- Lens-based stabilization: No No
- Aperture ring: Yes Yes

Accessories
- Lens hood: Built-in petal-type hood

The Samyang 8mm F2.8 UMC Fisheye is an interchangeable camera lens made in South Korea by Samyang Optics and sold under that brand, as well as Bower and Rokinon. The available mount format are Canon EF, Fuji X, MFT, Samsung NX, Sony E.

== See also ==
- Samyang 8mm f/3.5 Fisheye CS II
