= Samyang 24mm f/1.4 ED AS UMC =

Wide-angle camera lens

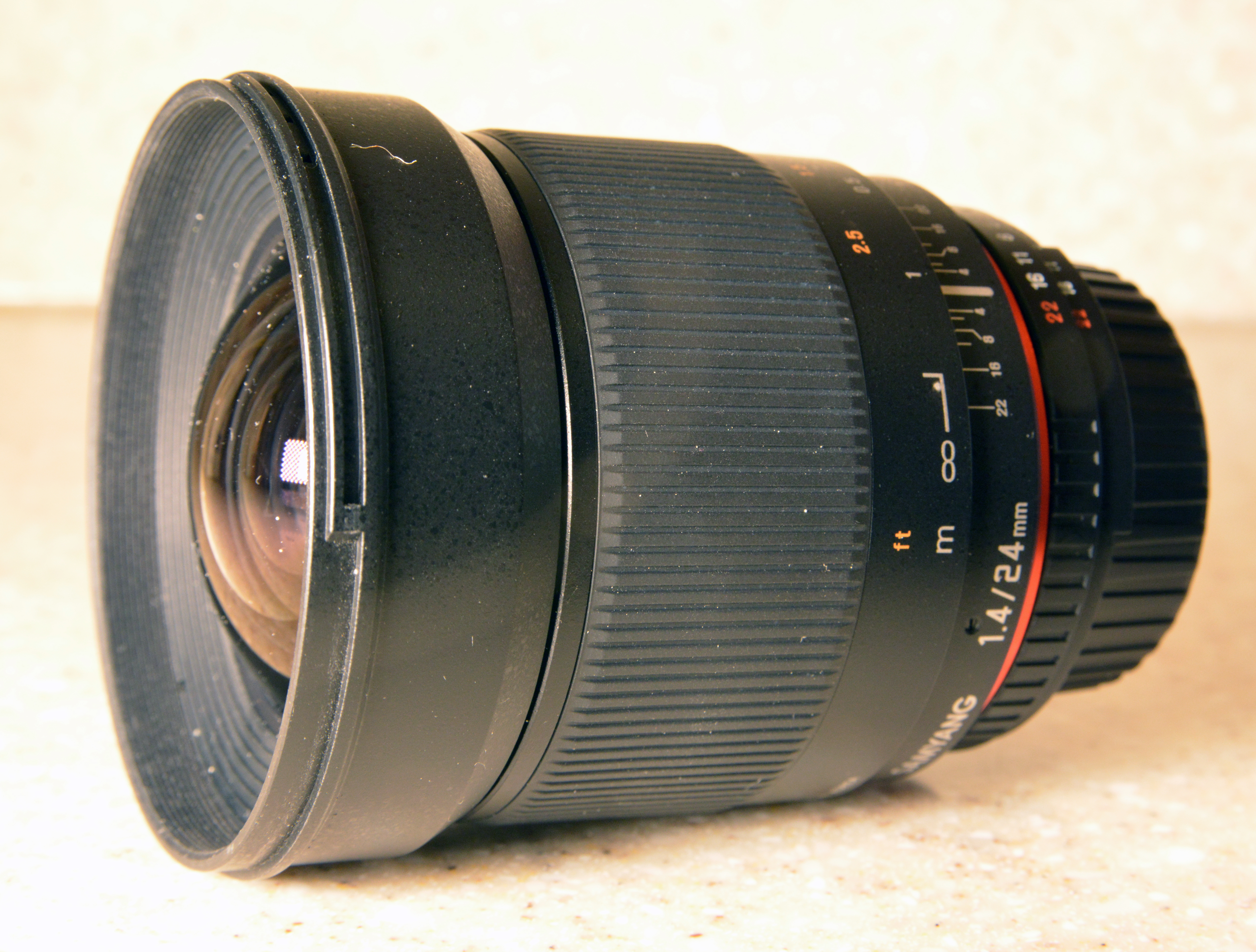
- Maker: Samyang
- Lens mount(s): Canon EF, Nikon F (FX), Four Thirds, Pentax KAF, Sony/Minolta Alpha, Sony E (NEX), Samsung NX

Technical data
- Type: Prime
- Focus drive: manual
- Focal length: 24mm
- Aperture (max/min): f/1.4
- Close focus distance: 0.25 metres (0.82 ft)
- Construction: 13 elements in 12 groups

Features
- Weather-sealing: No No
- Lens-based stabilization: No No
- Aperture ring: Yes Yes

Physical
- Diameter: 83 millimetres (3.3 in)
- Filter diameter: 77mm

History
- Introduction: 2011

The Samyang 24mm f/1.4 ED AS UMC is an interchangeable wide-angle prime lens for cameras with full frame or smaller sensors. It was announced by Samyang on August 12, 2011.
