= Samyang Reflex 300mm f/6.3 UMC CS =

Camera lens brand

- Maker: Samyang
- Lens mount(s): Canon EF-S, Four Thirds, Nikon F (DX), Sony/Minolta Alpha

Technical data
- Type: Prime
- Focal length: 300mm
- Aperture (max/min): f/6.3
- Close focus distance: 1.10 metres (3.6 ft)
- Max. focus distance: Infinity
- Construction: 8 elements in 8 groups

Features
- Manual focus override: No No
- Weather-sealing: No No
- Lens-based stabilization: No No
- Aperture ring: No No

Physical
- Max. length: 74 millimetres (2.9 in)
- Diameter: 65 millimetres (2.6 in)
- Weight: 260 grams (0.57 lb)
- Filter diameter: 25.5mm

History
- Introduction: 2014

The Samyang Reflex 300mm f/6.3 UMC CS is an interchangeable camera lens announced by Samyang on April 28, 2014.
