= Samyang 8mm F3.5 Aspherical IF MC Fisheye =

- Maker: Samyang
- Lens mount(s): Canon EF-S, Four Thirds, Nikon F (DX), Pentax KAF, Samsung NX, Sony/Minolta Alpha

Technical data
- Type: Prime
- Focal length: 8mm
- Aperture (max/min): f/3.5
- Close focus distance: 0.30 metres (0.98 ft)
- Construction: 10 elements in 7 groups

Features
- Manual focus override: No No
- Weather-sealing: No No
- Lens-based stabilization: No No
- Aperture ring: Yes Yes

Physical
- Max. length: 77 millimetres (3.0 in)
- Diameter: 75 millimetres (3.0 in)
- Weight: 443 grams (0.977 lb)

Accessories
- Lens hood: Built-in petal-type hood

The Samyang 8mm F3.5 Aspherical IF MC Fisheye is an interchangeable camera lens by Samyang.
