= Samyang 10mm f/2.8 ED AS NCS CS =

Samyang 10mm 1:2.8 ED AS NCS CS
- Maker: Samyang Optics
- Lens mount(s): Canon EF-M, Canon EF-S, Four Thirds, Fujifilm X, Micro Four Thirds, Nikon F (DX), Pentax KAF, Samsung NX, Sony/Minolta Alpha, Sony E (NEX)

Technical data
- Type: Prime
- Focal length: 10mm
- Aperture (max/min): f/2.8–f/22
- Close focus distance: 0.24 m (0.79 ft)
- Diaphragm blades: 6
- Construction: 14 elements in 9 groups

Features
- Manual focus override: No No
- Weather-sealing: No No
- Lens-based stabilization: No No
- Aperture ring: Yes Yes

Physical
- Max. length: 132 mm (5.2 in)
- Diameter: 87 mm (3.4 in)
- Weight: 625 g (1.378 lb)

Accessories
- Lens hood: Integrated hood

History
- Introduction: 2013

The Samyang 10mm 1:2.8 ED AS NCS CS is an interchangeable camera lens announced by Samyang on December 6, 2013.
