= Samyang 35mm F1.4 AS UMC =

- Maker: Samyang
- Lens mount(s): Canon EF, Nikon F (FX), Four Thirds, Pentax KAF, Sony/Minolta Alpha, Sony E (NEX), Samsung NX

Technical data
- Type: Prime
- Focal length: 35mm
- Aperture (max/min): f/1.4
- Close focus distance: 0.30 metres (0.98 ft)
- Construction: 12 elements in 10 groups

Features
- Manual focus override: No No
- Weather-sealing: No No
- Lens-based stabilization: No No
- Aperture ring: Yes Yes

Physical
- Max. length: 112 millimetres (4.4 in)
- Diameter: 63 millimetres (2.5 in)
- Weight: 660 grams (1.46 lb)
- Filter diameter: 77mm

History
- Introduction: 2010

The Samyang 35mm F1.4 AS UMC is an interchangeable moderate wide angle prime lens for cameras with full frame or smaller sensor. It was announced by Samyang on September 16, 2010.
