= Zeiss Otus 1.4/55 =

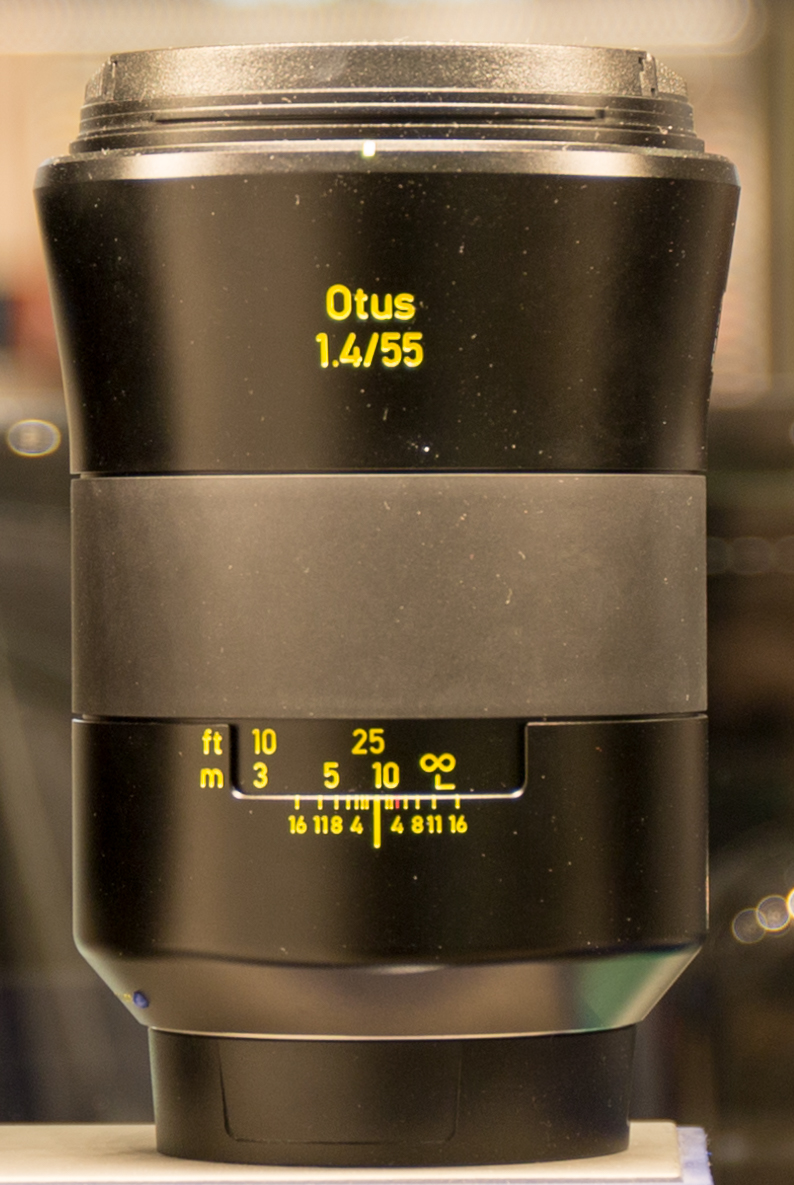
- Maker: Zeiss
- Lens mounts: Canon EF, Nikon F

Technical data
- Type: Prime
- Focus drive: None, manual only
- Focal length: 55 mm
- Aperture (max/min): f/1.4 to f/16
- Close focus distance: 0.50 m (1 ft 8 in)
- Max. magnification: 0.15×
- Construction: 12 elements in 10 groups

Features
- Lens-based stabilization: No No
- Application: Standard prime

Physical
- Max. length: 141 mm (5.6 in)
- Diameter: 92 mm (3.6 in)
- Weight: 970 g (34 oz)
- Filter diameter: 77 mm

Accessories
- Lens hood: Yes, included

Angle of view
- Horizontal: 36.7°
- Vertical: 24.9°
- Diagonal: 43.7°

History
- Introduction: 2013

Retail info
- MSRP: 3499 USD

The Zeiss Otus 1.4/55 is a manual focus standard prime lens for Canon Inc. and Nikon DSLR bodies. It was announced by Zeiss on 7 October 2013.

It is noted for producing a sharp image, with good correction for chromatic and spherical aberration as well as distortion. It produces pleasant bokeh, but vignettes strongly on full frame bodies at its minimum aperture.
