= Sony Carl Zeiss Sonnar T* FE 35mm F2.8 ZA =

Sony Zeiss Sonnar T* FE 35mm F2.8 ZA
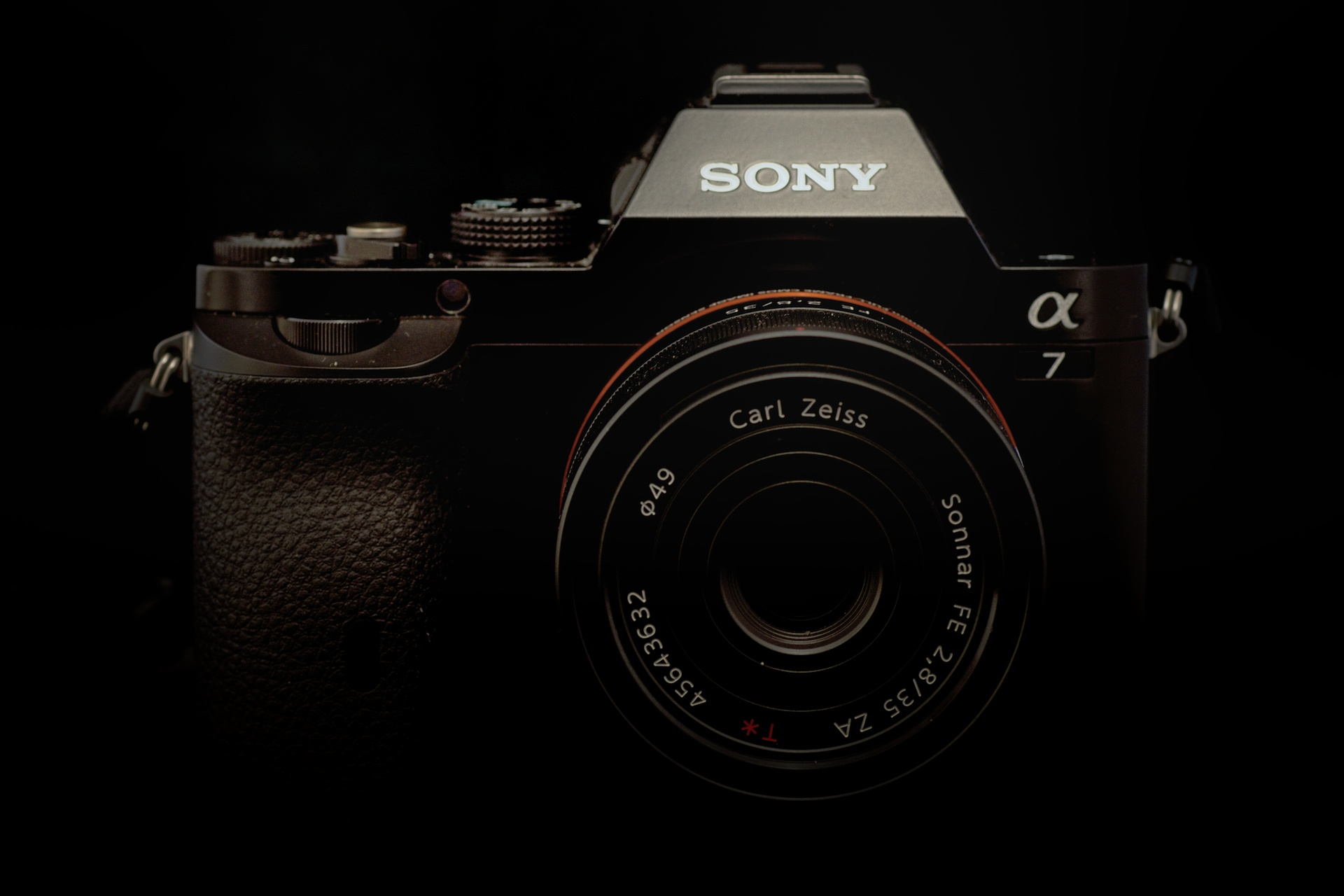
- Sony 35mm F2.8 ZA lens attached to the Sony α7
- Maker: Sony
- Lens mount(s): Sony E-mount

Technical data
- Type: Prime
- Focal length: 35mm
- Image format: 35mm full-frame
- Aperture (max/min): f/2.8
- Close focus distance: 0.35 metres (1.1 ft)
- Max. magnification: 0.12
- Diaphragm blades: 7
- Construction: 7 elements in 5 groups

Features
- Manual focus override: Yes Yes
- Weather-sealing: Yes Yes
- Lens-based stabilization: No No
- Aperture ring: No No
- Unique features: Carl Zeiss approved
- Application: Landscape, Street, Low-light

Physical
- Max. length: 37 millimetres (1.5 in)
- Diameter: 61.5 millimetres (2.42 in)
- Weight: 120 grams (0.26 lb)
- Filter diameter: 49mm

History
- Introduction: 2013

Retail info
- MSRP: $799 USD

The Sony Zeiss Sonnar T* FE 35mm F2.8 ZA is a wide-angle full-frame prime lens for the Sony E-mount. It was announced by Sony on October 13, 2015.

Though designed for Sony's full frame E-mount cameras, the lens can be used on Sony's APS-C E-mount camera bodies, with an equivalent full-frame field-of-view of 52.5mm.

== Build quality ==
The lens itself is made of a thin weather resistant aluminum shell over plastic internals. The lens is also one of the thinnest lenses offered for Sony full-frame cameras.

== See also ==
- List of Sony E-mount lenses
- Samyang Optics / Rokinon AF 35 mm f/2.8 FE
- Zeiss Sonnar
