= Samyang Optics / Rokinon AF 50 mm f/1.4 FE =

Samyang Optics / Rokinon AF 50mm F1.4 FE
- Maker: Samyang Optics
- Lens mount(s): Sony E-mount

Technical data
- Type: Prime
- Focal length: 50mm
- Image format: 35mm full-frame
- Aperture (max/min): f/1.4
- Close focus distance: 0.45 metres (1.5 ft)
- Max. magnification: 1:7 (0.15x)
- Diaphragm blades: 9
- Construction: 9 elements in 8 groups

Features
- Manual focus override: Yes Yes
- Weather-sealing: No No
- Lens-based stabilization: No No
- Aperture ring: No No
- Application: Landscape, Portrait, Low-light

Physical
- Max. length: 98 millimetres (3.9 in)
- Diameter: 74 millimetres (2.9 in)
- Weight: 585 grams (1.290 lb)
- Filter diameter: 67mm

History
- Introduction: 2016

Retail info
- MSRP: $699 USD

The Samyang Optics / Rokinon AF 50mm F1.4 FE is a standard full-frame prime lens for the Sony E-mount. It was announced by Samyang Optics on May 3, 2016.

Though designed for Sony's full frame E-mount cameras. The lens also can be used on Sony's APS-C E-mount camera bodies, with an equivalent full-frame field-of-view of 75mm.

== Build quality ==
The lens itself is made of a thin aluminum shell over plastic internals and includes a detachable petal-style lens hood.

This lens is in direct competition with Sony's own 50mm F1.4 prime lens, featuring similar specs and image quality.

== See also ==
- List of third-party E-mount lenses
- Samyang autofocus lenses
