= Fujinon XF 90mm F2 R LM WR =

Camera lens

- Maker: Fujifilm
- Lens mount(s): Fujifilm X

Technical data
- Type: Prime
- Focus drive: Stepper motor
- Focal length: 90mm
- Aperture (max/min): f/2.0
- Close focus distance: 0.60 metres (2.0 ft)
- Max. magnification: 0.2
- Diaphragm blades: 7
- Construction: 11 elements in 8 groups

Features
- Manual focus override: No No
- Weather-sealing: Yes Yes
- Lens-based stabilization: No No
- Aperture ring: Yes Yes

Physical
- Max. length: 105 millimetres (4.1 in)
- Diameter: 75 millimetres (3.0 in)
- Weight: 540 grams (1.19 lb)
- Filter diameter: 62mm

History
- Introduction: 2015

The Fujinon XF 90mm F2 R LM WR is an interchangeable camera lens announced by Fujifilm on May 18, 2015.
