= Samyang Optics / Rokinon AF 35 mm f/2.8 FE =

Samyang Optics / Rokinon AF 35mm F2.8 FE
- Maker: Samyang Optics
- Lens mount(s): Sony E-mount

Technical data
- Type: Prime
- Focal length: 35mm
- Image format: 35mm full-frame
- Aperture (max/min): f/2.8
- Close focus distance: 0.35 metres (1.1 ft)
- Max. magnification: 1:8 (0.12x)
- Diaphragm blades: 7
- Construction: 7 elements in 6 groups

Features
- Manual focus override: Yes Yes
- Weather-sealing: No No
- Lens-based stabilization: No No
- Aperture ring: No No
- Application: Landscape, Street, Low-light

Physical
- Max. length: 33 millimetres (1.3 in)
- Diameter: 61.8 millimetres (2.43 in)
- Weight: 85.6 grams (0.189 lb)
- Filter diameter: 49mm

History
- Introduction: 2017

Retail info
- MSRP: $399 USD

The Samyang Optics / Rokinon AF 35mm F2.8 FE is a wide-angle full-frame prime lens for Sony E-mount. It was announced by Samyang Optics on June 5, 2017.

Though designed for Sony's full frame E-mount cameras, the lens can be used on Sony's APS-C E-mount camera bodies, with an equivalent full-frame field-of-view of 52.5mm.

== Build quality ==
The lens itself is made of a thin aluminum shell over plastic internals and includes a detachable pancake-style lens hood.

This lens is comparable to Sony's own 35mm lens, featuring similar specs and image quality.

== See also ==
- List of third-party E-mount lenses
- List of Sony E-mount lenses
