= Pentax DA 560mm lens =

Pentax HD DA 560mm F5.6 ED AW
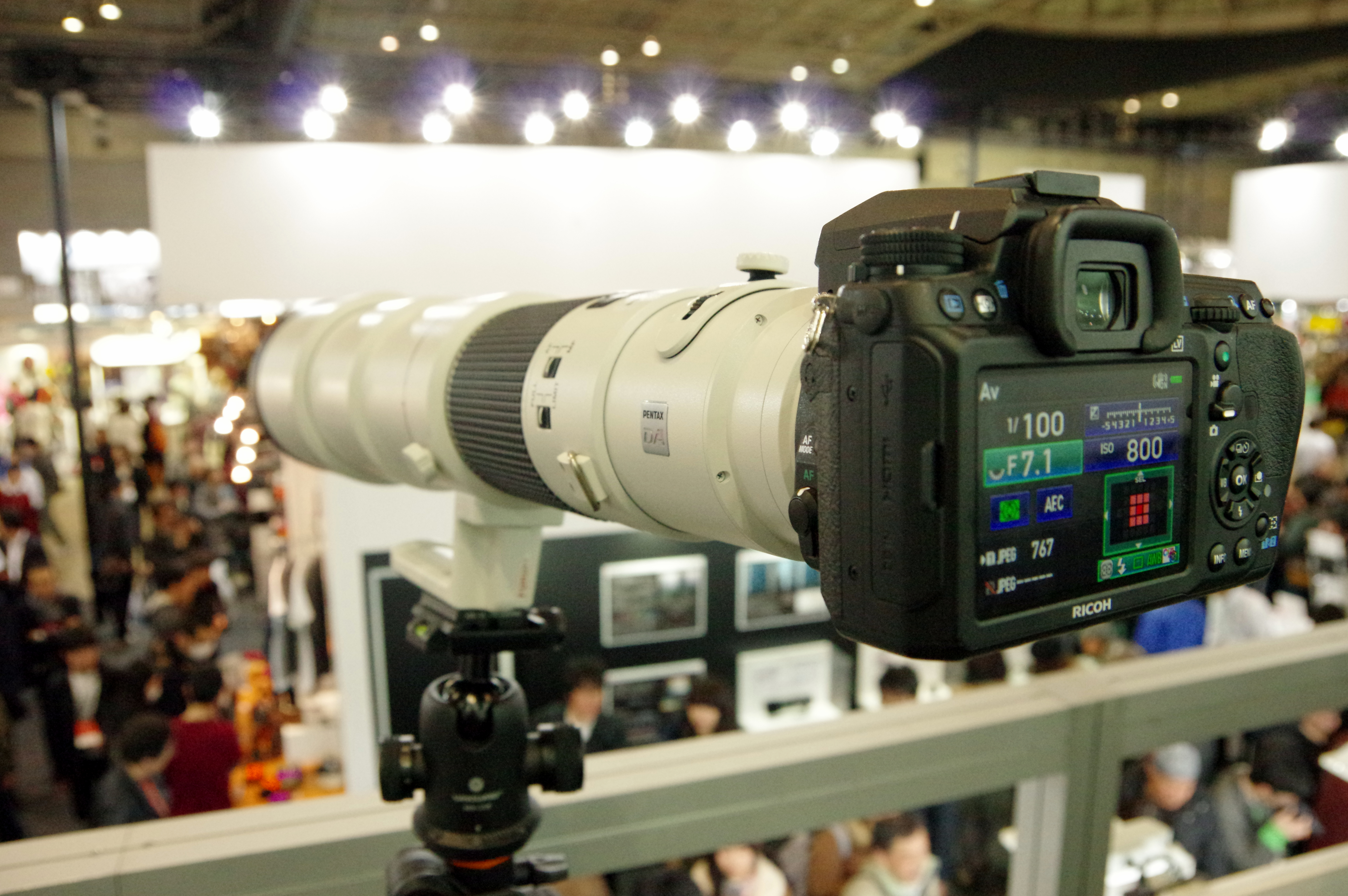
- Maker: Ricoh

Technical data
- Type: Prime
- Focus drive: Brushless DC motor
- Focal length: 560mm
- Focal length (35mm equiv.): 840mm
- Image format: 24x36mm
- Aperture (max/min): f/5.6 / f/45
- Close focus distance: 18.37 feet (5.60 m)
- Max. magnification: 0.10x
- Diaphragm blades: 9
- Construction: 6 elements in 5 groups

Features
- Manual focus override: Yes Yes
- Weather-sealing: Yes Yes
- Application: wildlife, sports, astrophotography

Physical
- Max. length: 521.7 millimetres (20.54 in)
- Diameter: 130.3 millimetres (5.13 in)
- Weight: 3,040 grams (107 oz)
- Filter diameter: 40.5mm (drop-in), 112mm (front lens)

Software
- Lens ID: 8 211

Accessories
- Lens hood: integrated

Angle of view
- Horizontal: 3.7° (APS-C), 2.5° (FF)
- Diagonal: 2.9° (APS-C), 1.9° (FF)

History
- Introduction: 2012
- Discontinuation: 2021

Retail info
- MSRP: 6799 USD

As of July 2015, the Pentax HD DA 560mm F5.6 ED AW is the longest prime lens in production under the Pentax brand. It has a telescope-type optical design.
The lens is fully compatible with the K-1 full-frame DSLR and covers the 35mm image circle. On the K-1, lens correction profiles are supported to remove chromatic aberrations and vignetting.
