= Samyang 500mm f/8 =

Samyang 500mm F8.0 MC Mirror
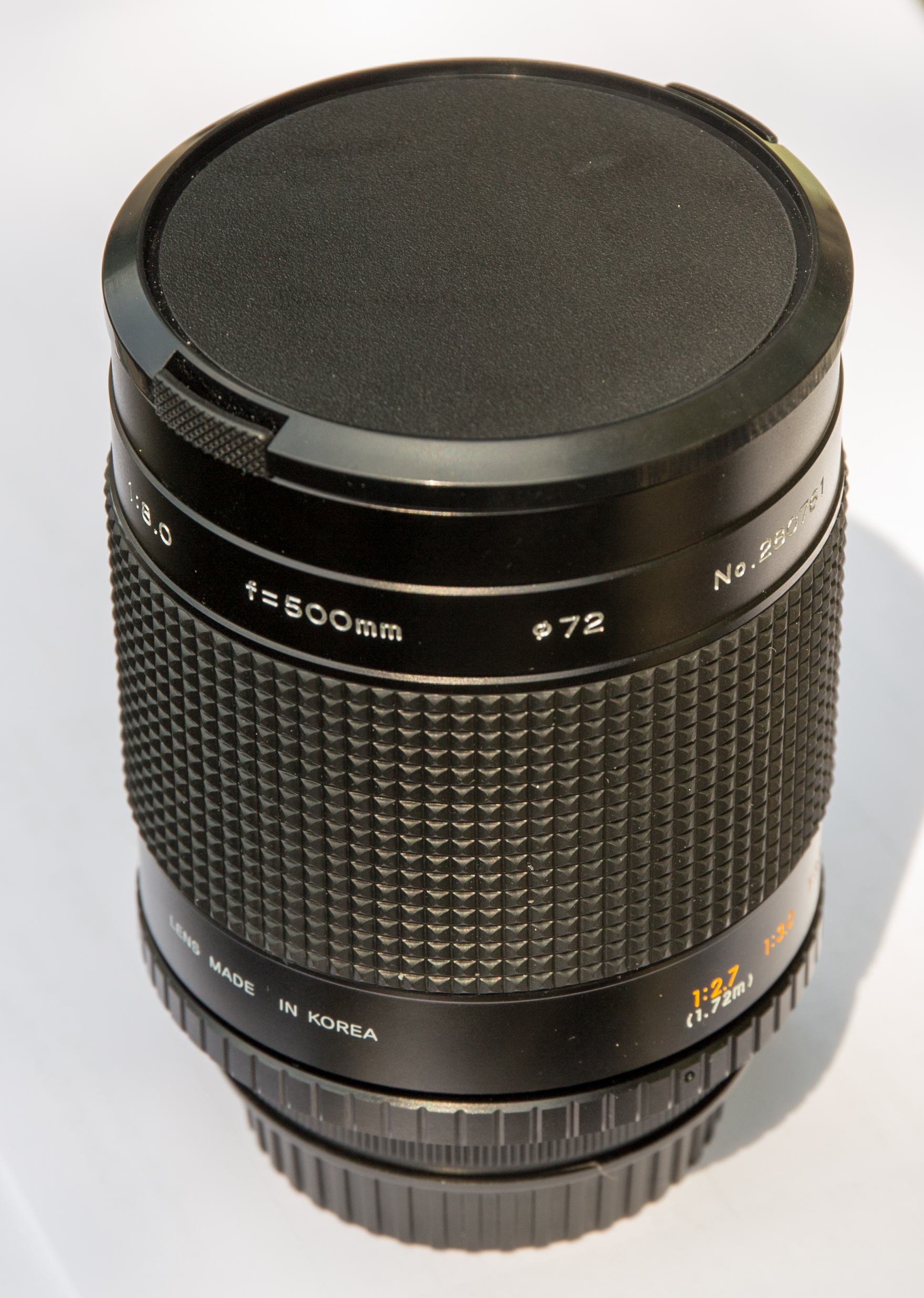
- Maker: Samyang Optics
- Lens mount(s): T-mount

Technical data
- Type: tele, prime, mirror lenses
- Focal length: 500 mm
- Aperture (max/min): f/ 8.0 fixed
- Close focus distance: 1.7 m (5.6 ft)
- Max. magnification: 1:2.7×
- Diaphragm blades: na
- Construction: 7 elements in 6 groups

Features
- Lens-based stabilization: No No
- Macro capable: No No
- Aperture ring: No No
- Application: tele

Physical
- Max. length: 87.7 mm (3.45 in)
- Diameter: 77 mm (3.0 in)
- Weight: 330 g (12 oz)
- Filter diameter: 72 mm or 30.5 mm (rear)

Accessories
- Lens hood: na

Angle of view
- Diagonal: 5°

The Samyang 500mm F8.0 MC Mirror is a supertelephoto lens and is designed for full frame DSLRs. It is a mirror lens. The lens is made in South Korea by Samyang Optics and marketed under several brand names, including Rokinon and Walimex.

The lens uses manual focus only. As all mirror lenses, it cannot change the aperture. Only available mount is the T-Mount and can be connected to several other mounts via adapter. Currently no hood is available. Filter can be either 72 mm at the front or 30.5 screwed in at the rear side

== Images of the Samyang 500mm F8.0 MC Mirror lens ==
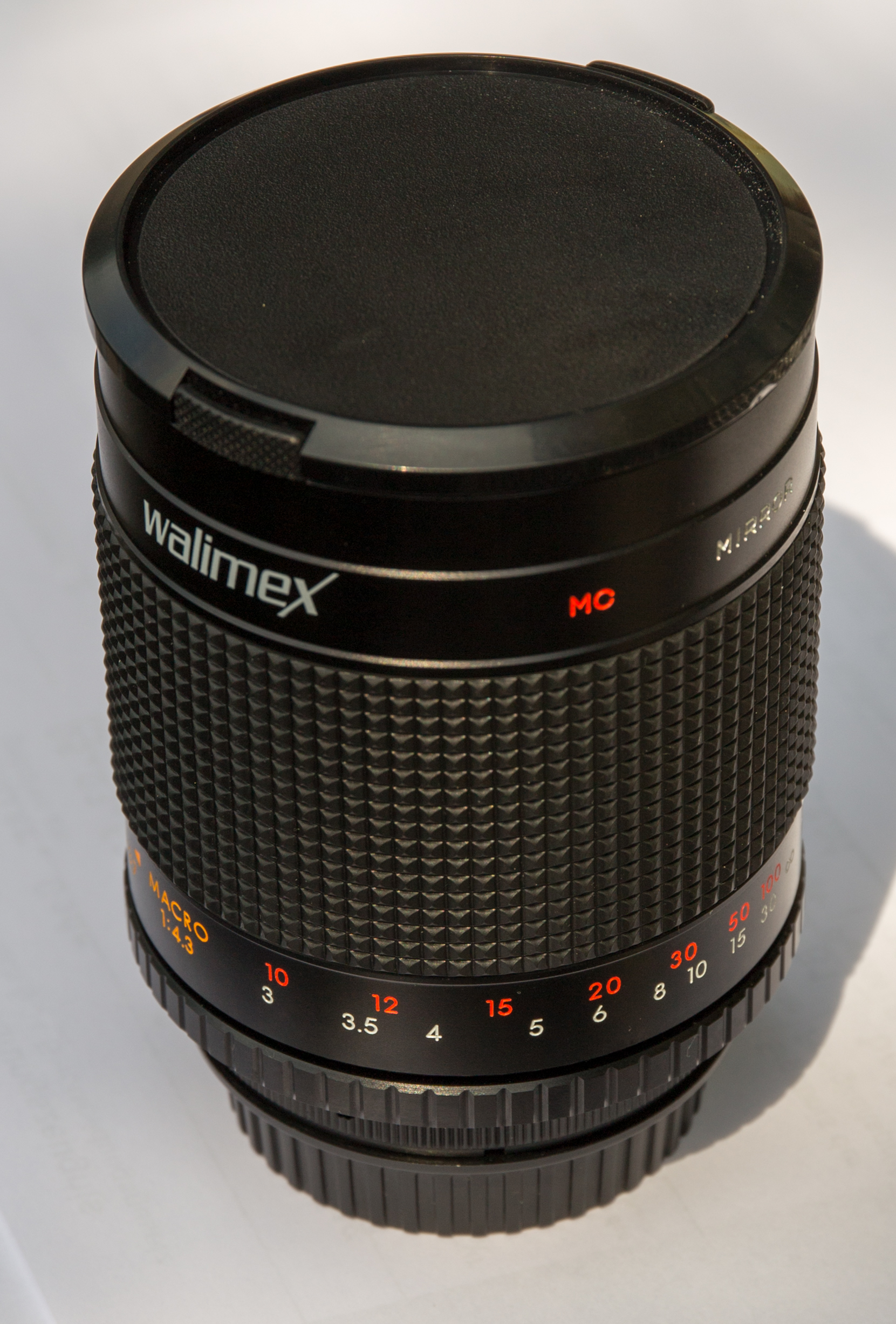
Samyang/Walimex 500mm f/8.0

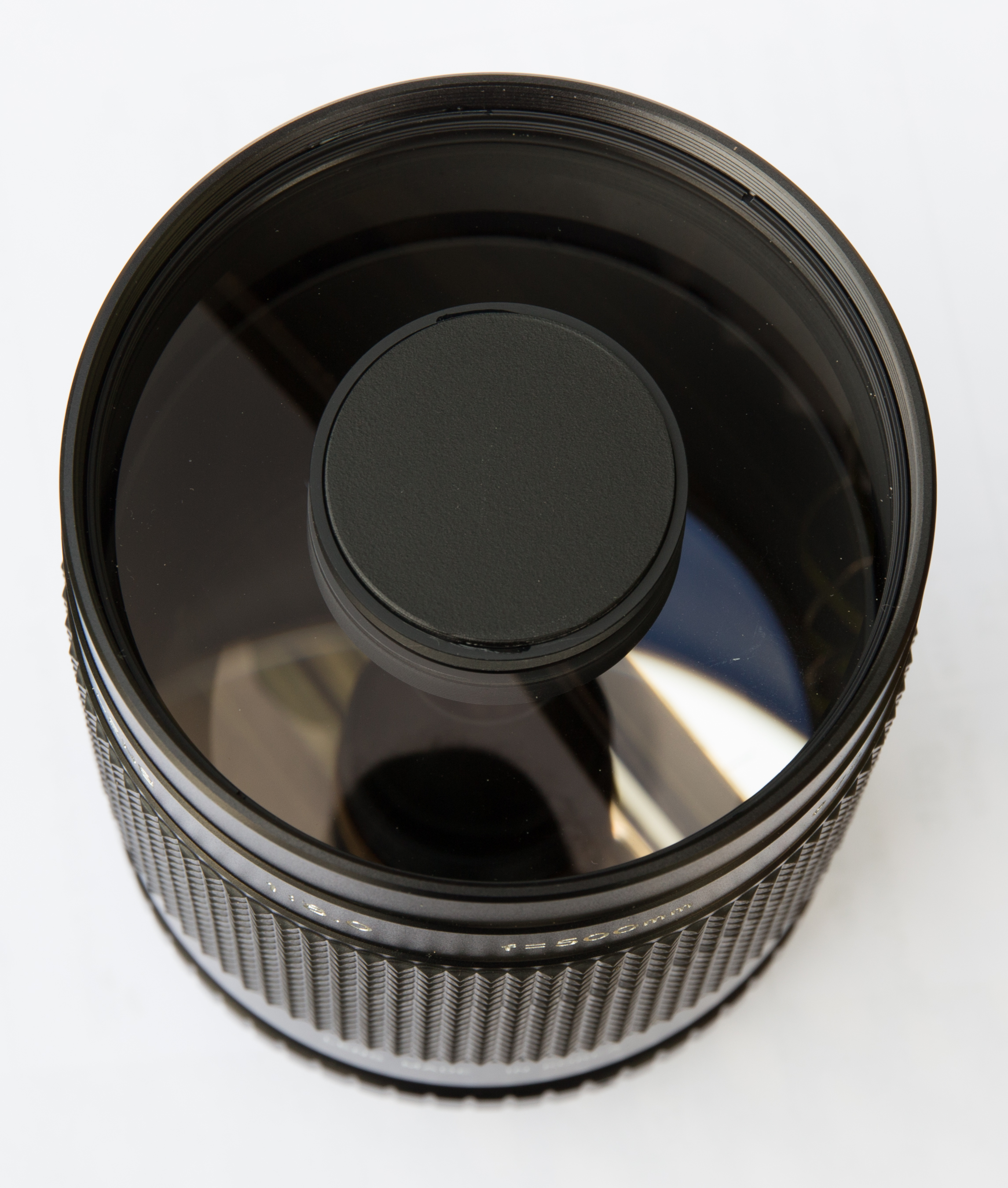
front view, Samyang/Walimex 500mm f/8.0, mirror visible at the lower part

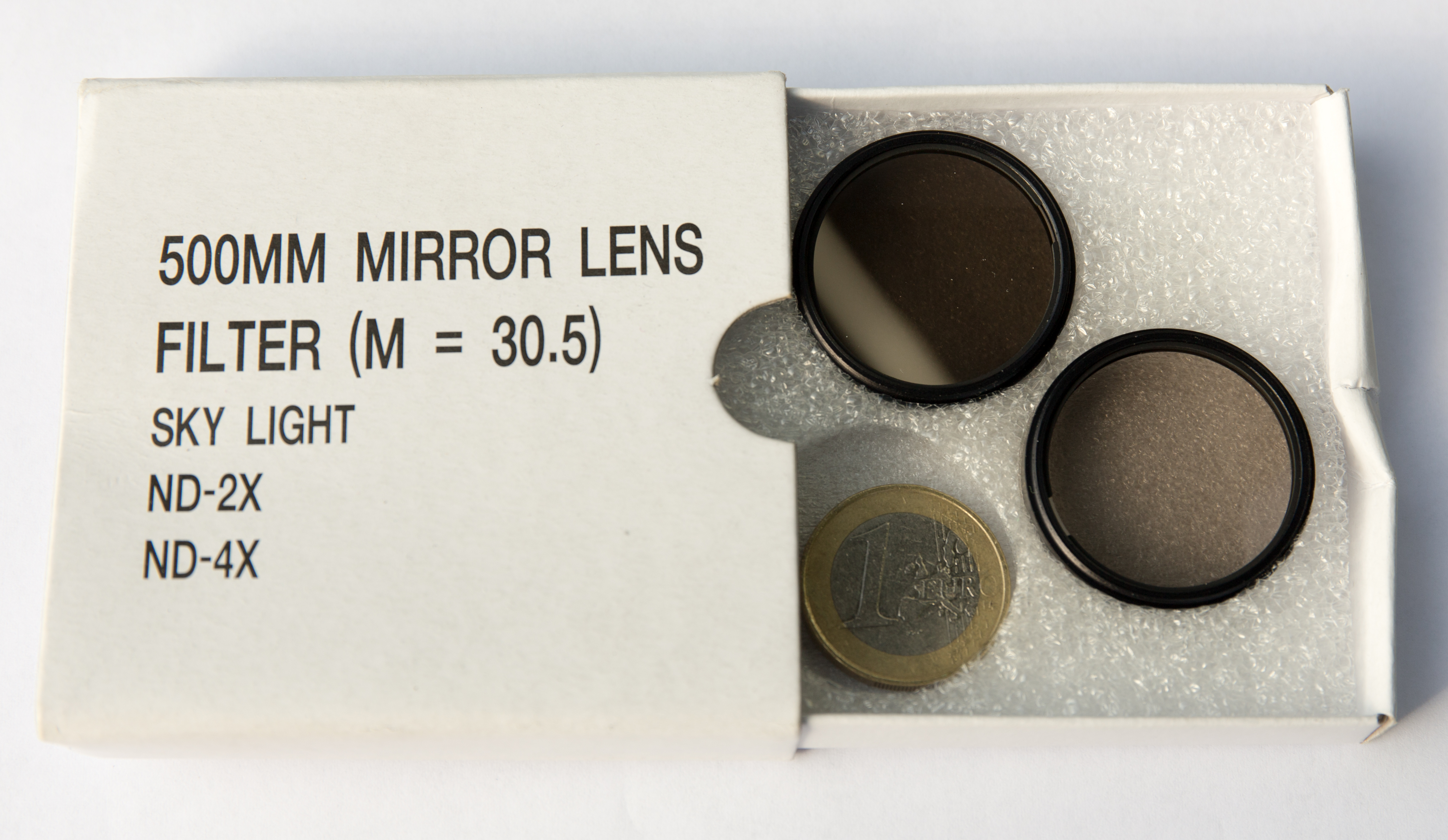
Samyang/Walimex 500mm f/8.0, Skylight, ND2 and ND4 30.5 mm filter, part of the delivery

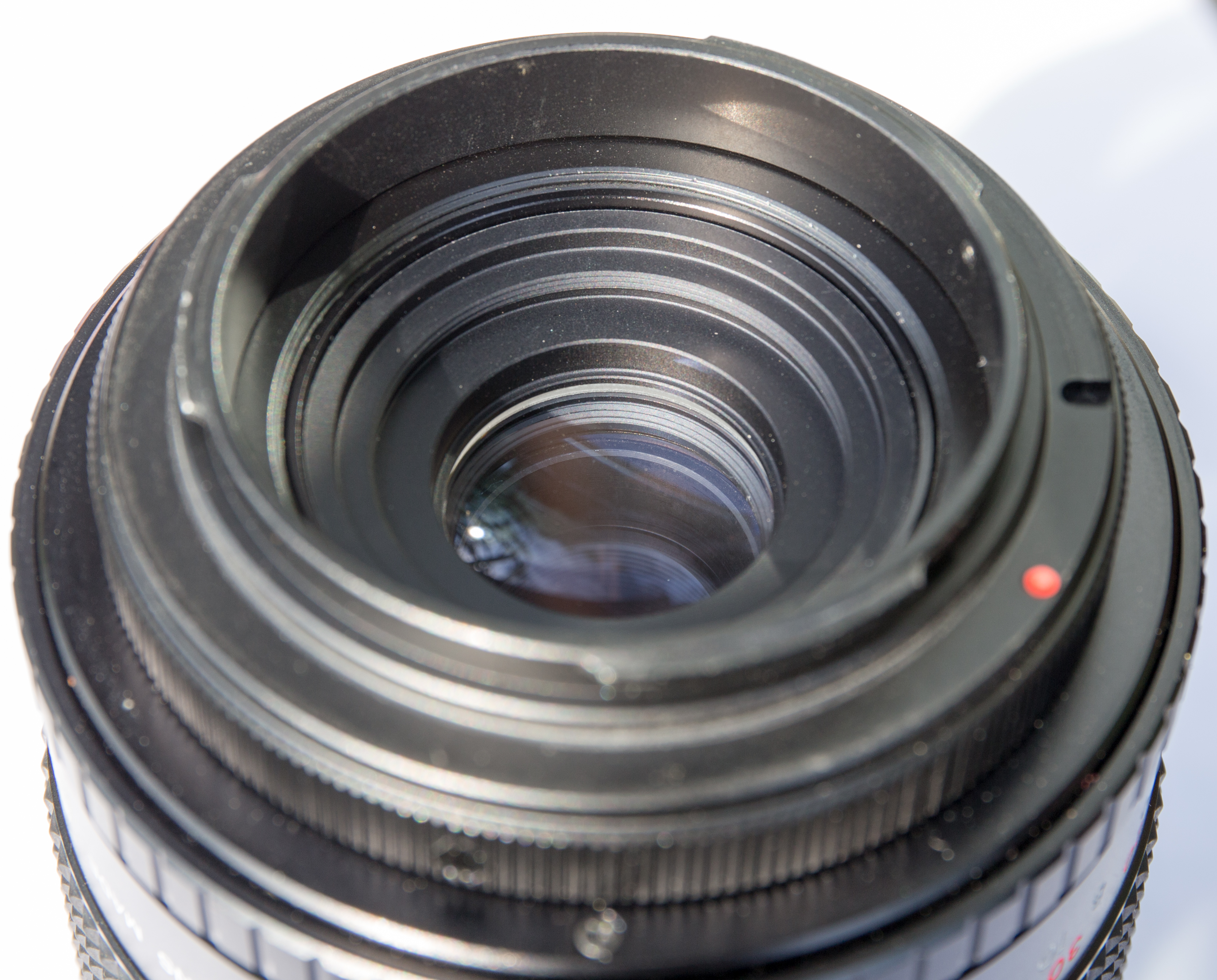
rear view, Samyang/Walimex 500mm f/8.0, with adapter to Canon EF mounted

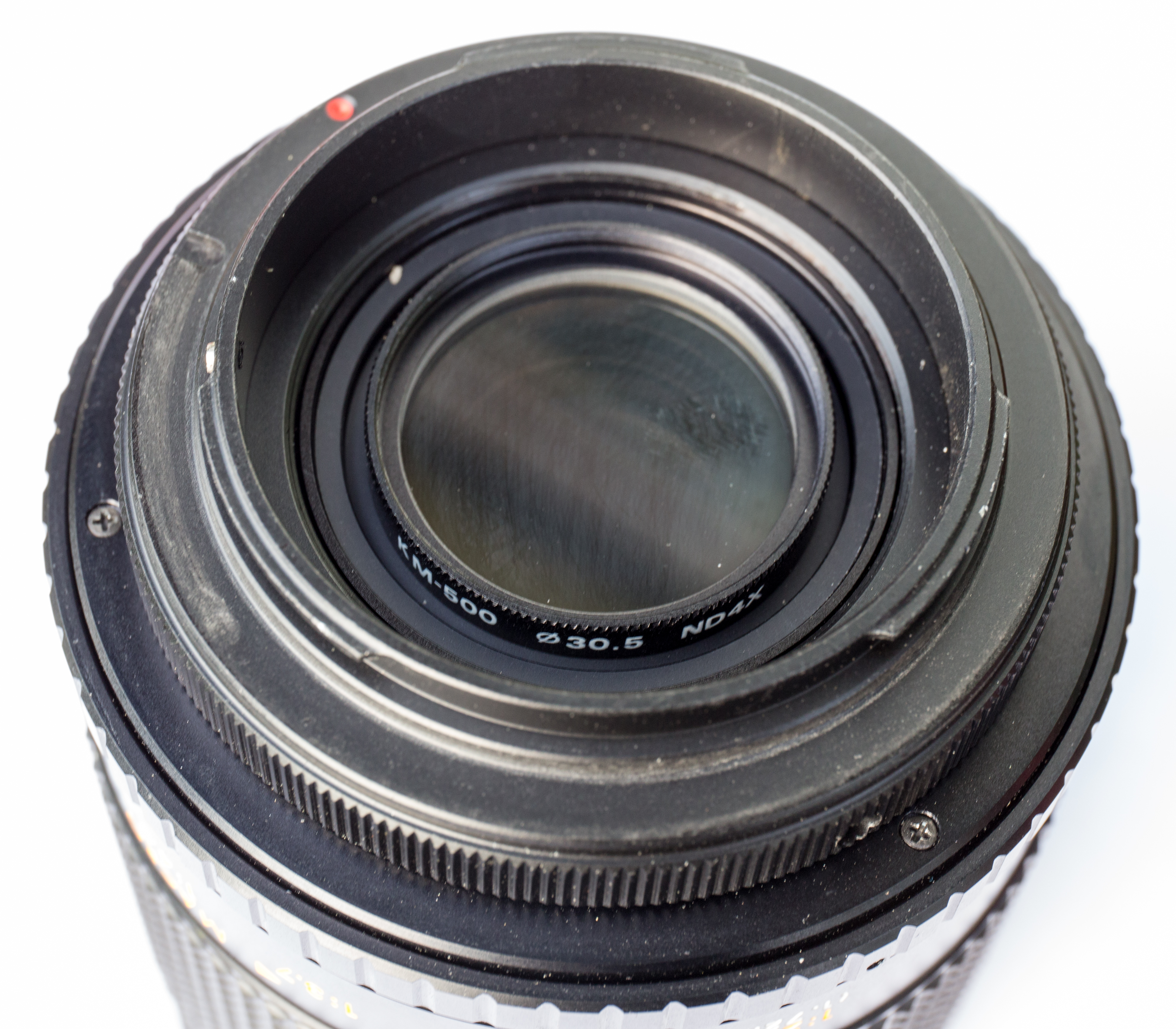
rear view, Samyang/Walimex 500mm f/8.0, ND4 filter connected, with adapter to Canon EF mounted

== Images Taken with Samyang 500mm F8.0 MC Mirror lens ==
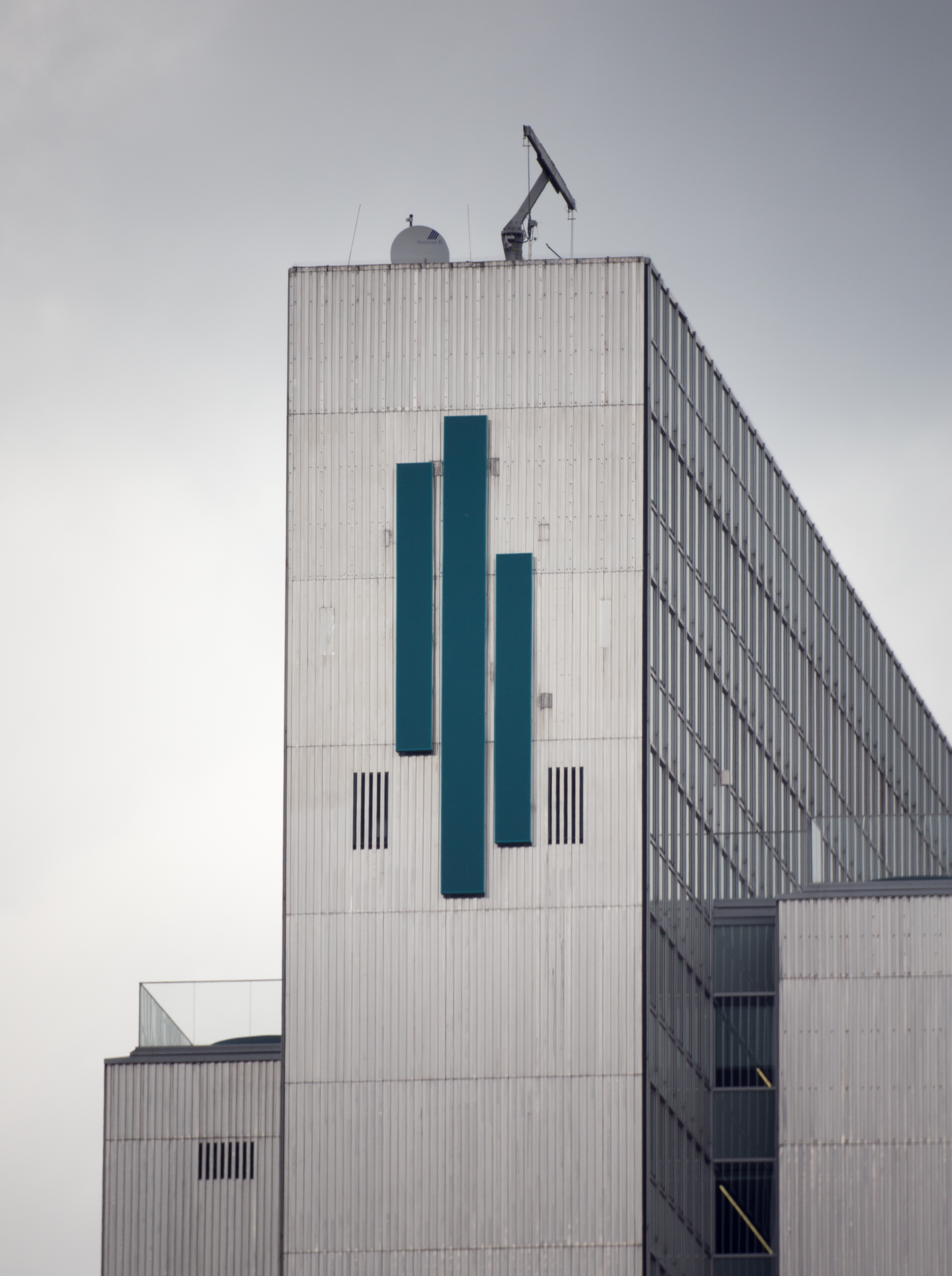
Dreischeibenhaus, Germany, with new Logo, taken with Samyang/Walimex 500mm f/8.0

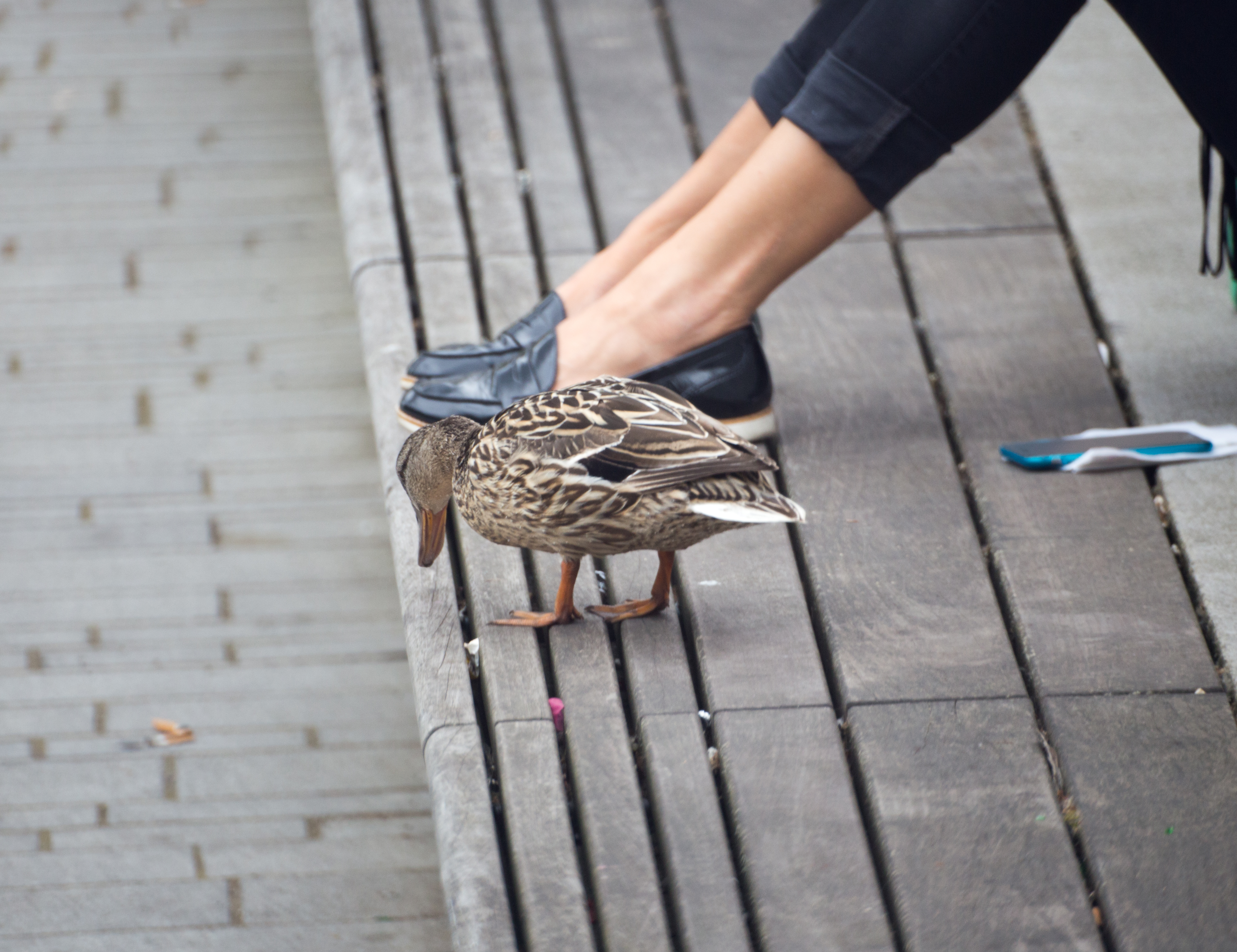
Duck, taken with Samyang/Walimex 500mm f/8.0

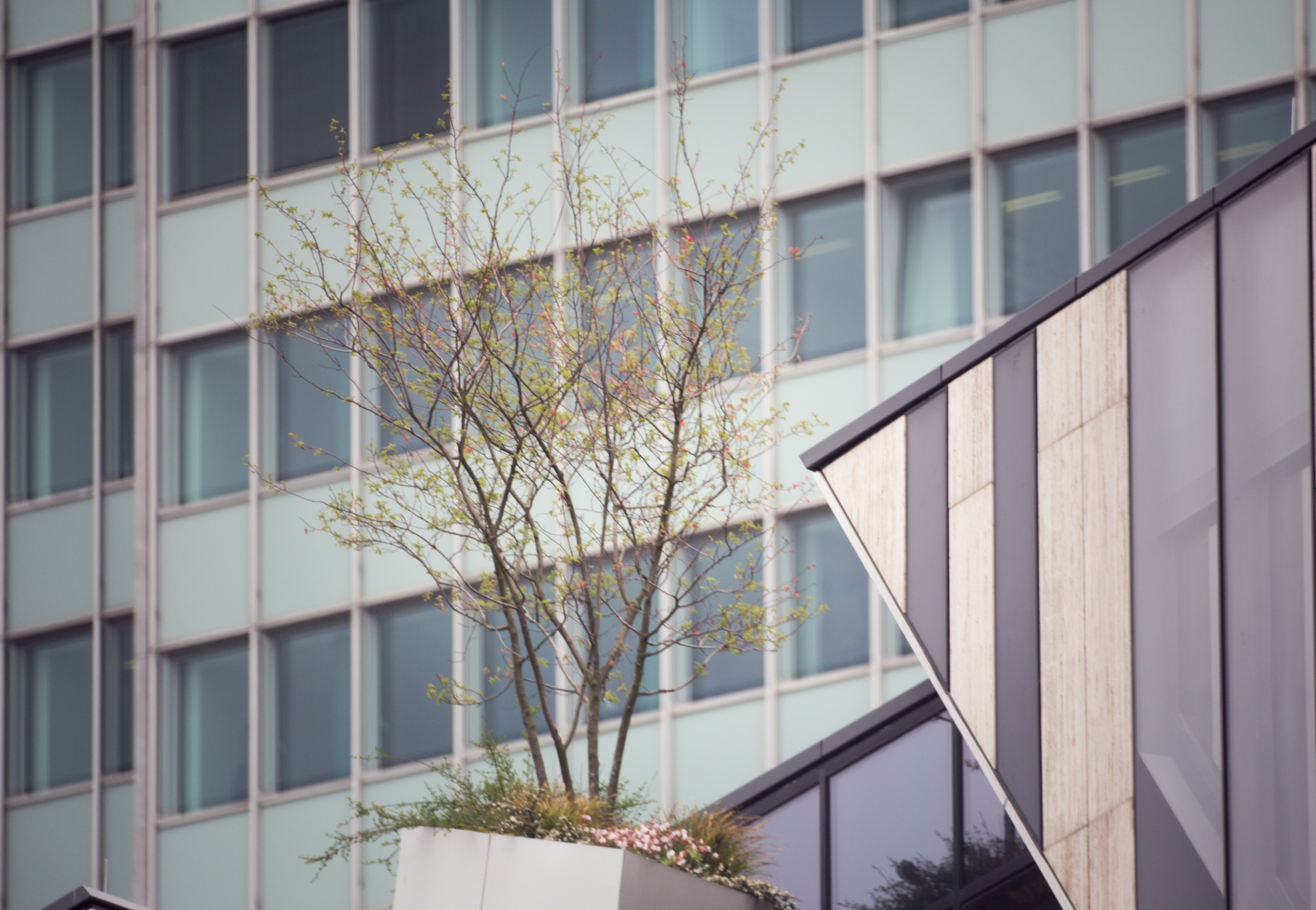
Kö-Bogen trees, Germany, taken with Samyang/Walimex 500mm f/8.0

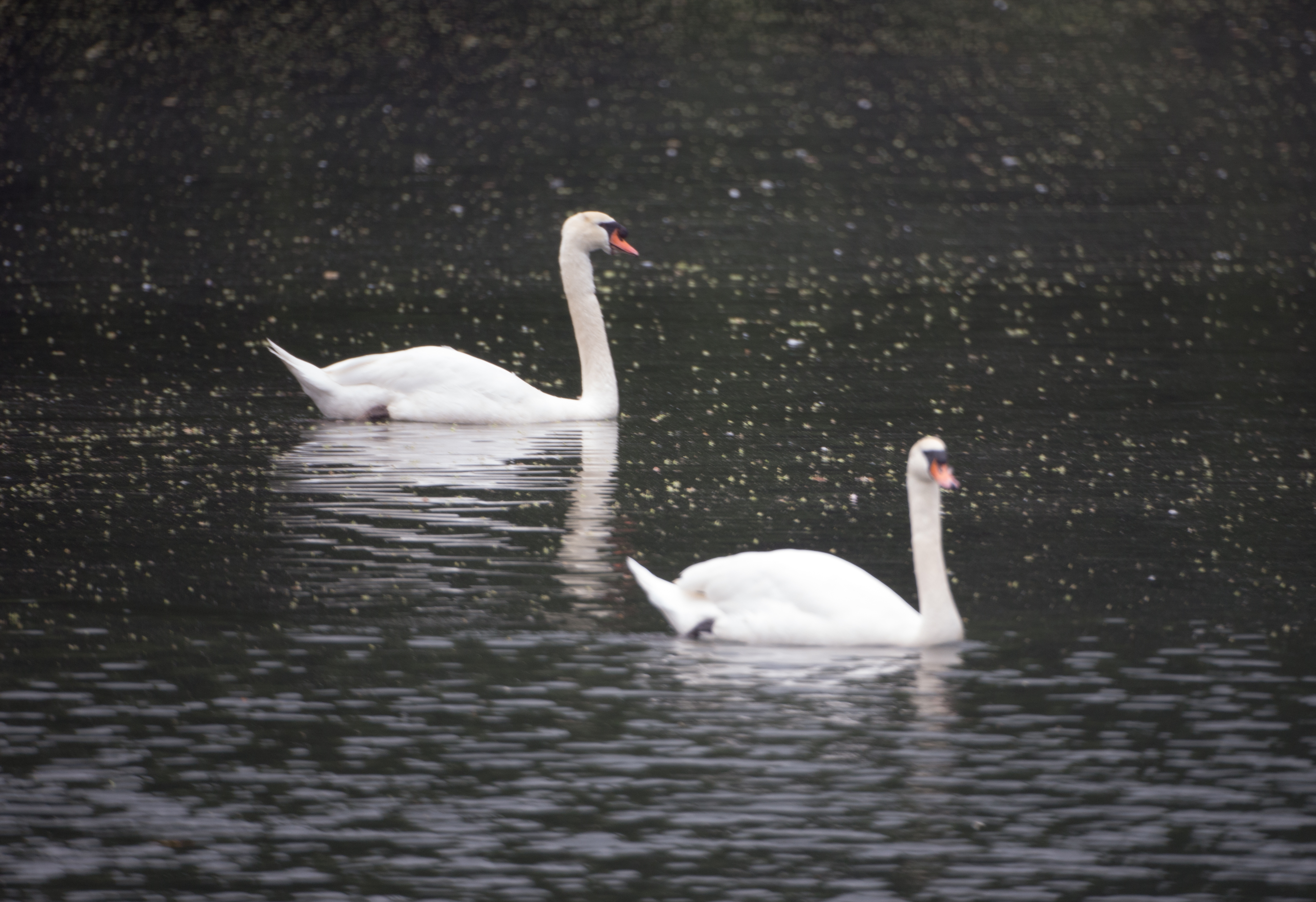
Swan, taken with Samyang/Walimex 500mm f/8.0
