= Samyang 8mm f/3.5 Fisheye CS II =

Samyang 8mm F3.5 UMC Fish-Eye CS II
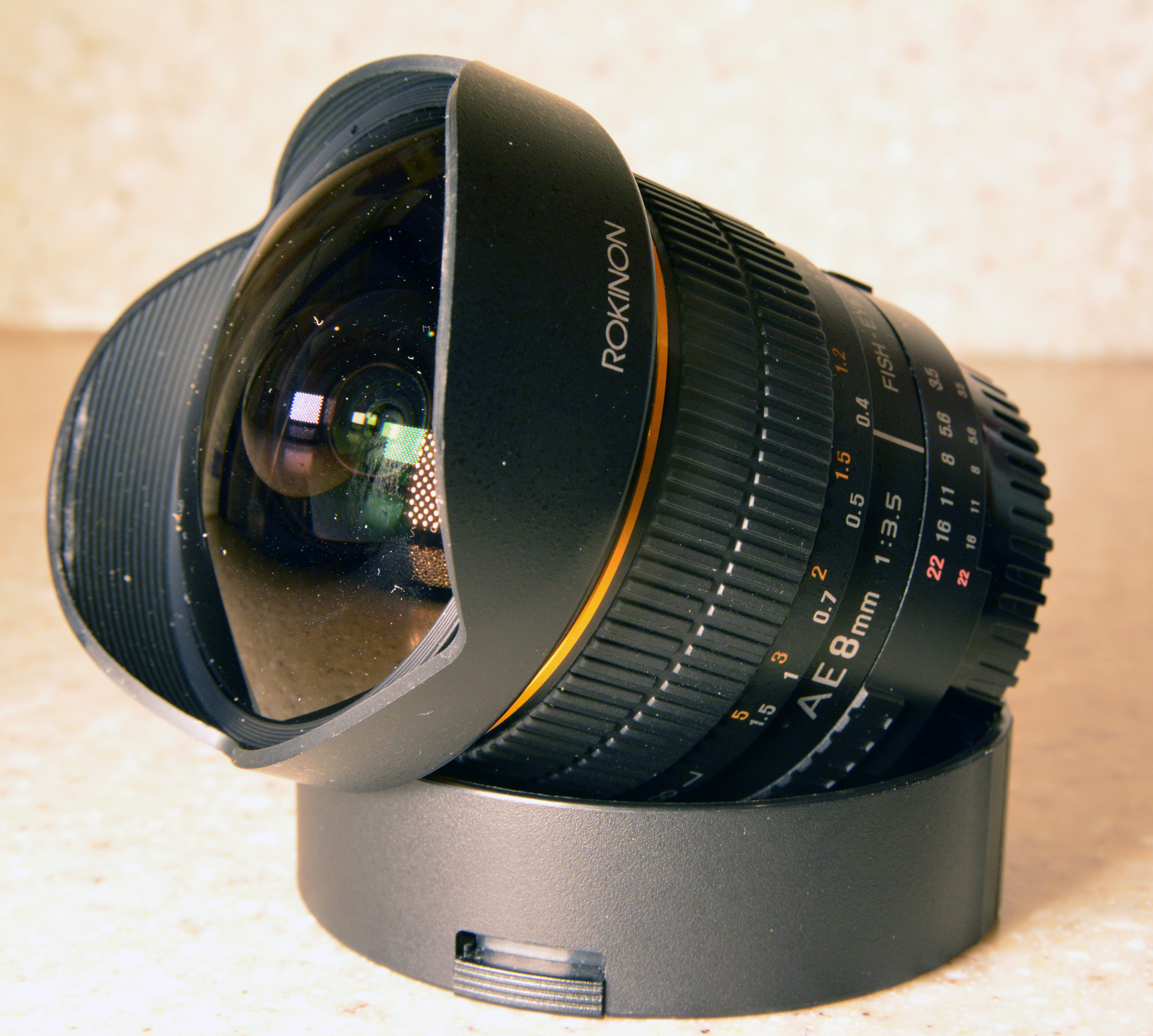
- Rokinon brand, older version without removable lens hood
- Maker: Samyang Optics
- Lens mount(s): Canon EF, Fuji X, Nikon F, MFT, Pentax K, Samsung NX, Sony E, Sony α/Minolta A

Technical data
- Type: fisheye
- Focal length: 8 mm
- Focal length (35mm equiv.): 12 mm (except Canon, 12.8 mm, and MFT, 16 mm)
- Aperture (max/min): f/3.5–f/22
- Close focus distance: 0.3 m (0.98 ft)
- Max. focus distance: ∞
- Diaphragm blades: 7
- Construction: 10 elements in 7 groups

Features
- Lens-based stabilization: No No
- Macro capable: No No
- Aperture ring: Yes Yes
- Unique features: Diagonal fisheye
- Application: video, general

Physical
- Max. length: 72.6–101.4 mm (2.86–3.99 in) depending on mount
- Diameter: 77.8 mm (3.06 in)
- Weight: 410–515 g (14.5–18.2 oz) depending on mount
- Filter diameter: ✗ not possible

Accessories
- Lens hood: ✓ yes, fixed except Nikon

Angle of view
- Diagonal: 139.3°–180° depending on mount

The Samyang 8mm F3.5 UMC Fish-Eye CS II is a fisheye photographic lens using the stereographic projection and is designed for crop factor APS-C DSLRs. It is made in South Korea by Samyang Optics and marketed under several brand names besides Samyang, including Bower, Falcon, Polar, Pro-Optic, Rokinon, Vivitar and Walimex Pro (Walser GmbH & Co. KG). There are versions for the Canon EF, Fujifilm X, Nikon F, MFT, Pentax K, Samsung NX, Sony E, Sony α/Minolta A mounts.

The lens uses manual focus only. For most versions of the lens, the aperture must be set manually. For Nikon there are versions with and without a chip to communicate aperture information with the camera. Versions with the chip (model AE8M-N) can set the aperture automatically. The CS II version of the lens has a removable lens hood.

== See also ==
- Samyang 8mm F2.8 UMC Fisheye
