= Samyang Optics / Rokinon AF 14 mm f/2.8 FE =

Samyang Optics / Rokinon AF 14mm F2.8 FE
- Maker: Samyang Optics
- Lens mount(s): Sony E-mount

Technical data
- Type: Prime
- Focal length: 14mm
- Image format: 35mm full-frame
- Aperture (max/min): f/2.8 - f/22
- Close focus distance: 0.20 metres (0.66 ft)
- Max. magnification: 1:8 (0.12x)
- Diaphragm blades: 7
- Construction: 14 elements in 10 groups

Features
- Manual focus override: Yes Yes
- Weather-sealing: No No
- Lens-based stabilization: No No
- Aperture ring: No No
- Application: Landscape, Low-light

Physical
- Max. length: 98 millimetres (3.9 in)
- Diameter: 86 millimetres (3.4 in)
- Weight: 505 grams (1.113 lb)
- Filter diameter: None

History
- Introduction: 2016

Retail info
- MSRP: $799 USD

The Samyang Optics / Rokinon AF 14mm F2.8 FE is an ultra wide-angle full-frame prime lens for Sony E-mount. It was announced by Samyang Optics on August 17, 2016

The lens is currently the widest-angle autofocus prime lens featuring a large maximum aperture of f/2.8 and coverage of Sony's full-frame sensor cameras. Though designed for Sony's full frame E-mount cameras, the lens can be used on Sony's APS-C E-mount camera bodies, with an equivalent full-frame field-of-view of 21mm.

== See also ==
- List of third-party E-mount lenses
- Samyang autofocus lenses
