= Fujinon XF 23mm F1.4 R =

- Maker: Fujifilm
- Lens mount(s): Fujifilm X

Technical data
- Type: Prime
- Focus drive: Micromotor
- Focal length: 23mm
- Aperture (max/min): f/1.4
- Close focus distance: 0.28 metres (0.92 ft)
- Max. magnification: 0.1
- Diaphragm blades: 7
- Construction: 11 elements in 8 groups

Features
- Manual focus override: No No
- Weather-sealing: No No
- Lens-based stabilization: No No
- Aperture ring: Yes Yes

Physical
- Max. length: 63 millimetres (2.5 in)
- Diameter: 72 millimetres (2.8 in)
- Weight: 300 grams (0.66 lb)
- Filter diameter: 62mm

History
- Introduction: 2013

The Fujinon XF 23mm F1.4 R is an interchangeable camera lens announced by Fujifilm on September 5, 2013.
