= Sony Zeiss Planar T* FE 50mm F1.4 ZA =

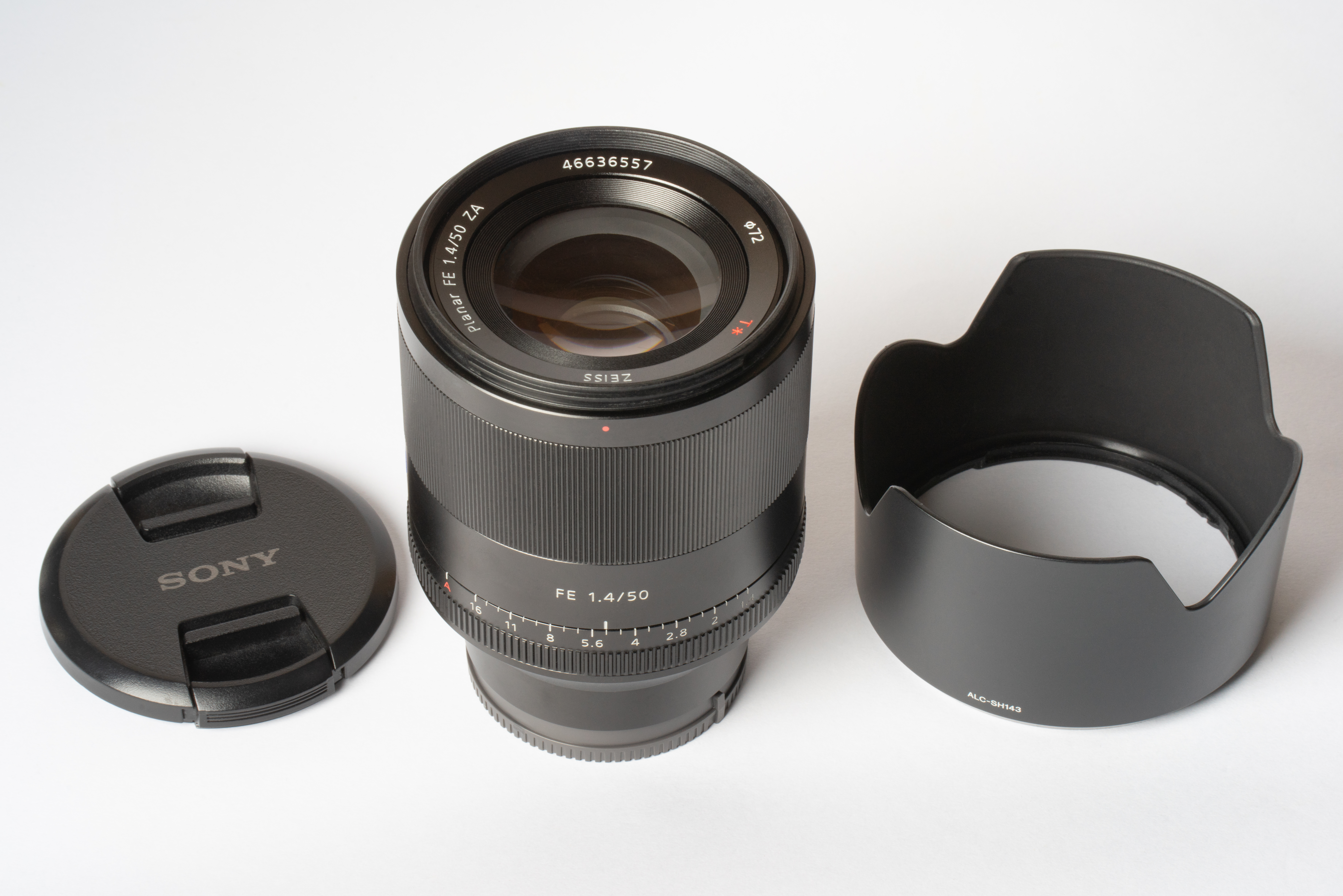
- Maker: Sony
- Lens mount(s): Sony E-mount

Technical data
- Type: Prime
- Focus drive: Piezoelectric
- Focal length: 50mm
- Image format: 35mm full-frame
- Aperture (max/min): f/1.4
- Close focus distance: 0.45 metres (1.5 ft)
- Max. magnification: 1:7 (0.15x)
- Diaphragm blades: 11
- Construction: 12 elements in 9 groups

Features
- Manual focus override: Yes Yes
- Weather-sealing: Yes Yes
- Lens-based stabilization: No No
- Aperture ring: Yes Yes
- Unique features: Carl Zeiss approved
- Application: Landscape, Portrait, Low-light

Physical
- Max. length: 108 millimetres (4.3 in)
- Diameter: 83.5 millimetres (3.29 in)
- Weight: 778 grams (1.715 lb)
- Filter diameter: 72mm

Accessories
- Lens hood: ALC-SH137

History
- Introduction: 2016

Retail info
- MSRP: $1399 USD

The Sony Zeiss Planar T* FE 50mm F1.4 ZA is a large-aperture, standard full-frame prime lens for the Sony E-mount. It was released by Sony in July 2016.

Though designed for Sony's full frame E-mount cameras, the lens can be used on Sony's APS-C E-mount camera bodies, with an equivalent full-frame field-of-view of 75 mm.

This lens has an external aperture ring.

== See also ==
- List of Sony E-mount lenses
- Samyang Optics / Rokinon AF 50 mm f/1.4 FE
- Sigma 50mm f/1.4 DG HSM Art
- Zeiss Planar
