= Samyang 8mm f3.5 fisheye =

Samyang 8mm F3.5 Fish-Eye
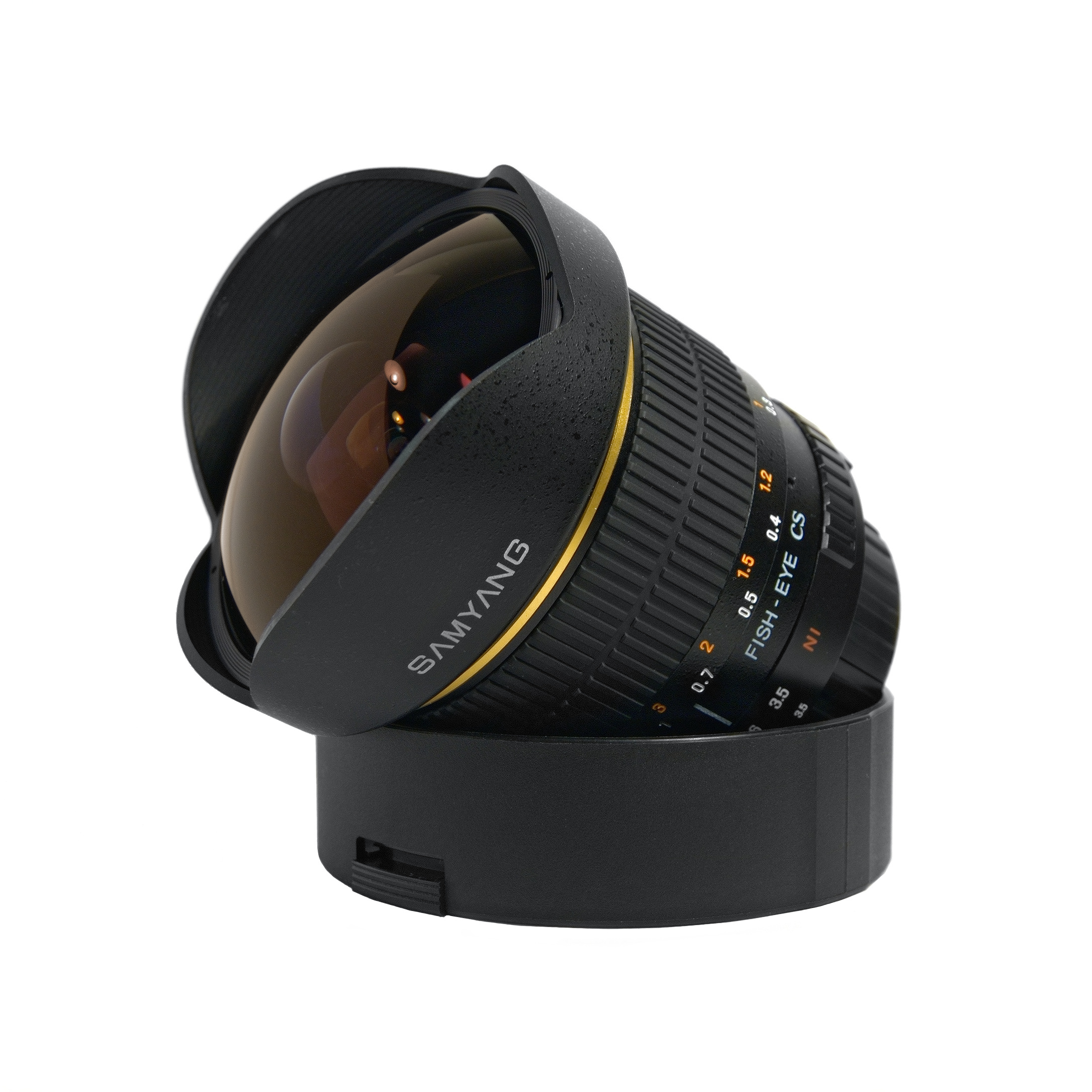
- Maker: Samyang Optics

Technical data
- Type: fisheye
- Focal length: 8 mm
- Aperture (max/min): f/ 3.5 - f/ 22
- Close focus distance: 0.3 m (0.98 ft)
- Diaphragm blades: 7
- Construction: 10 elements in 7 groups

Features
- Lens-based stabilization: No No
- Macro capable: No No
- Aperture ring: Yes Yes
- Application: video, general

Physical
- Max. length: 74.8 mm (2.94 in)–103.6 mm (4.08 in) (depends on the mount)
- Diameter: 75 mm (3.0 in)
- Weight: 411 g (14.5 oz)–516 g (18.2 oz) (depends on the mount)
- Filter diameter: not possible

Angle of view
- Diagonal: 139.3°–180° (depends on the mount)

The Samyang 8mm f/3.5 fisheye is a fisheye photographic lens using the stereographic projection and is designed for crop factor APS-C DSLRs. It is made in South Korea by Samyang Optics and marketed under several brand names, including Rokinon.

The lens uses manual focus only. For most versions of the lens, the aperture must be set manually. For Nikon there are versions with and without a chip to communicate aperture information with the camera. Versions with the chip (model AE8M-N) can set the aperture automatically. The CS version of the lens has a fixed lens hood.
