= LK Samyang =

South Korean Optical Equipment Manufacturer

Samyang Optics Company Limited
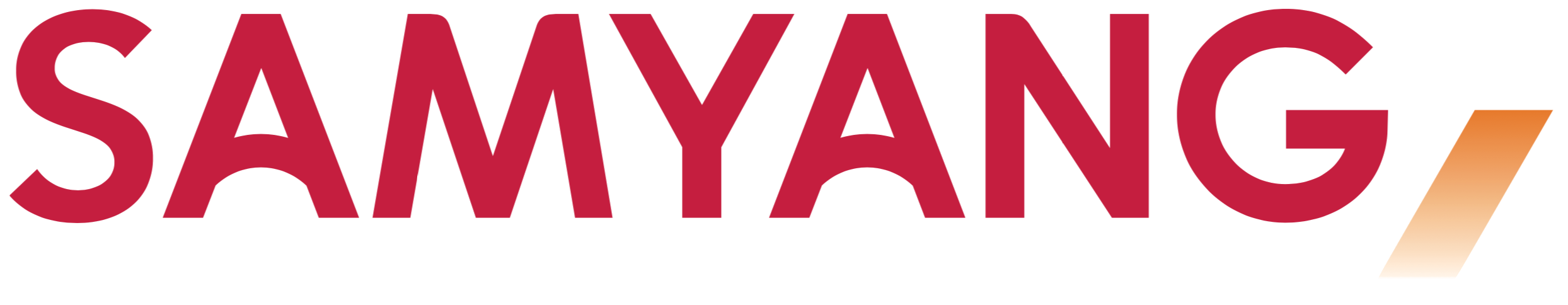

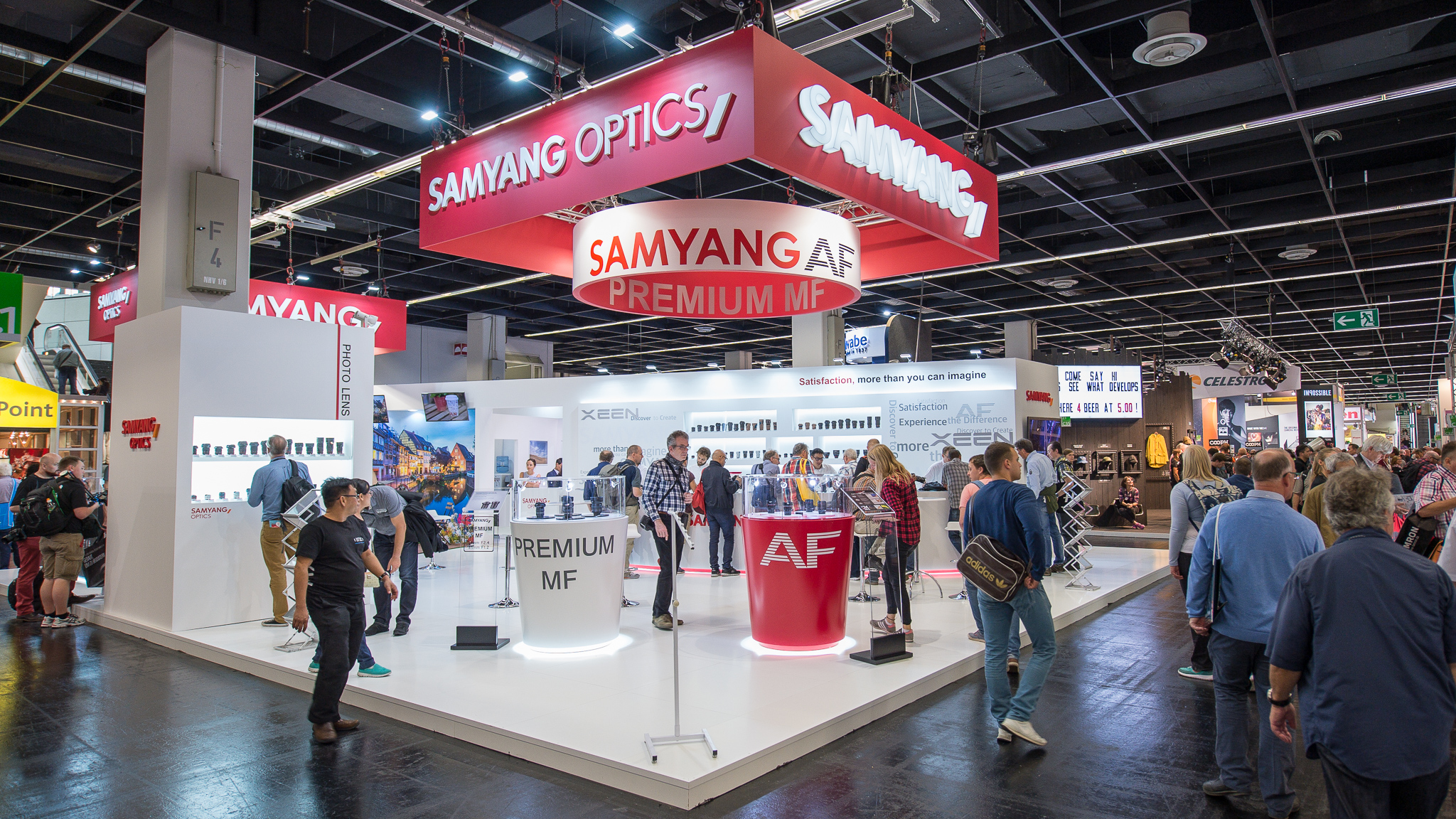
- 2016 Photokina - Samyang Optics
- Type: Public (Korean: 삼양옵틱스)
- Industry: Optics
- Founded: 1972
- Headquarters: Masan, South Korea
- Area served: Worldwide
- Key people: Choong Hyun Hwang (CEO)
- Products: Camera lenses
- Number of employees: 150
- Website: www.samyanglensglobal.com

Samyang Optics is a South Korean manufacturer of camera lenses for several major brands of third-party mounts for still photography and video cameras. The company was founded in 1972 and has about 150 employees. Samyang exports to 58 countries through 39 overseas agents and distributors.

In July 2023, Samyang joined the L-Mount Alliance.

On March 28, 2024, "Samyang Optics" officially changed its name to "LK Samyang Co., Ltd". "LK" stands for "Leading Korea".

Samyang products are also sold under a wide variety of different brand names. Some examples are Rokinon, Bower, Opteka, Vivitar, Phoenix and Quantaray.

== Products ==
=== Autofocus lenses ===
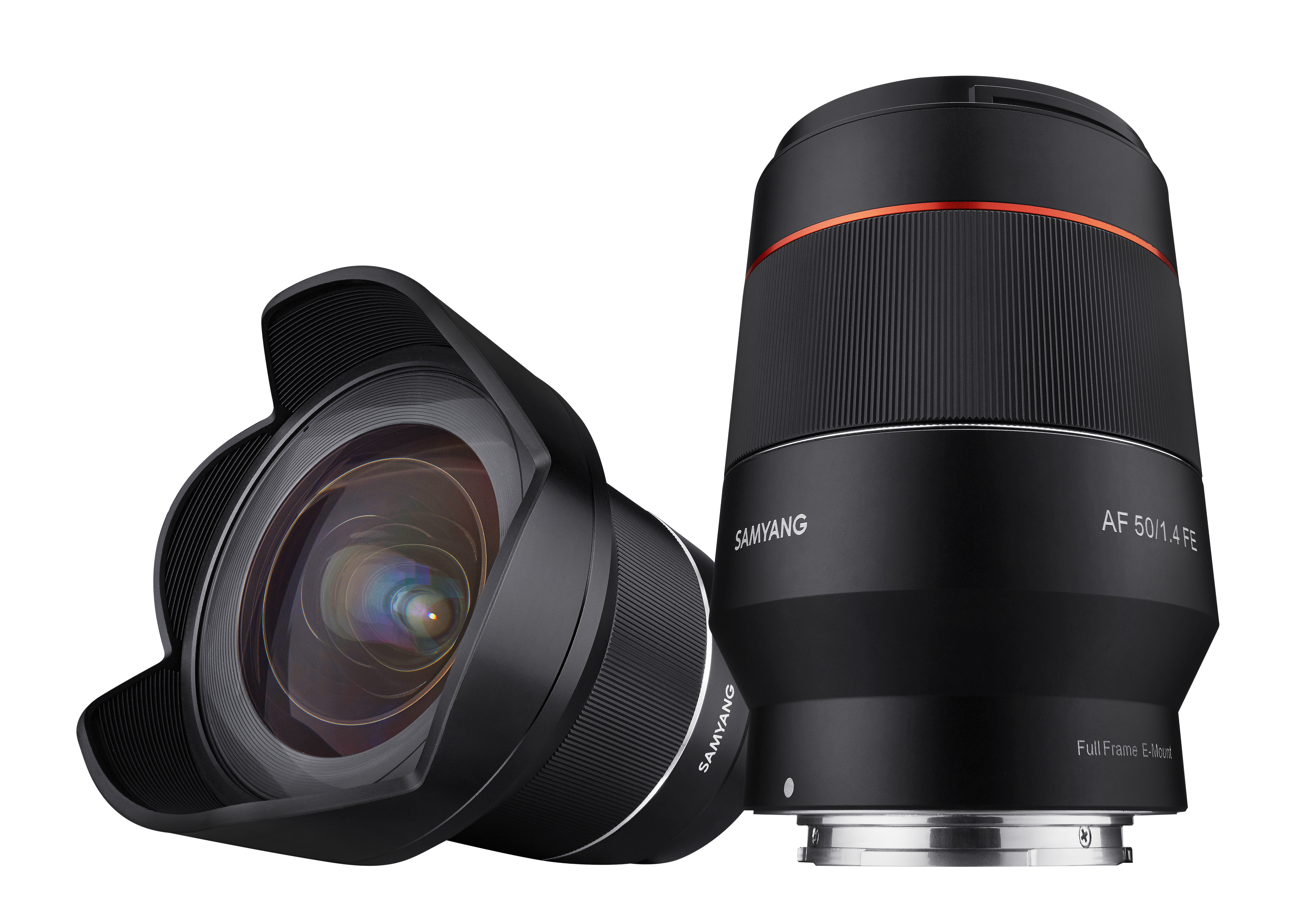
Samyang AF lens

Autofocus lenses:

For Canon EF Mount:

- AF 14 mm f/2.8 EF
- AF 85 mm f/1.4 EF

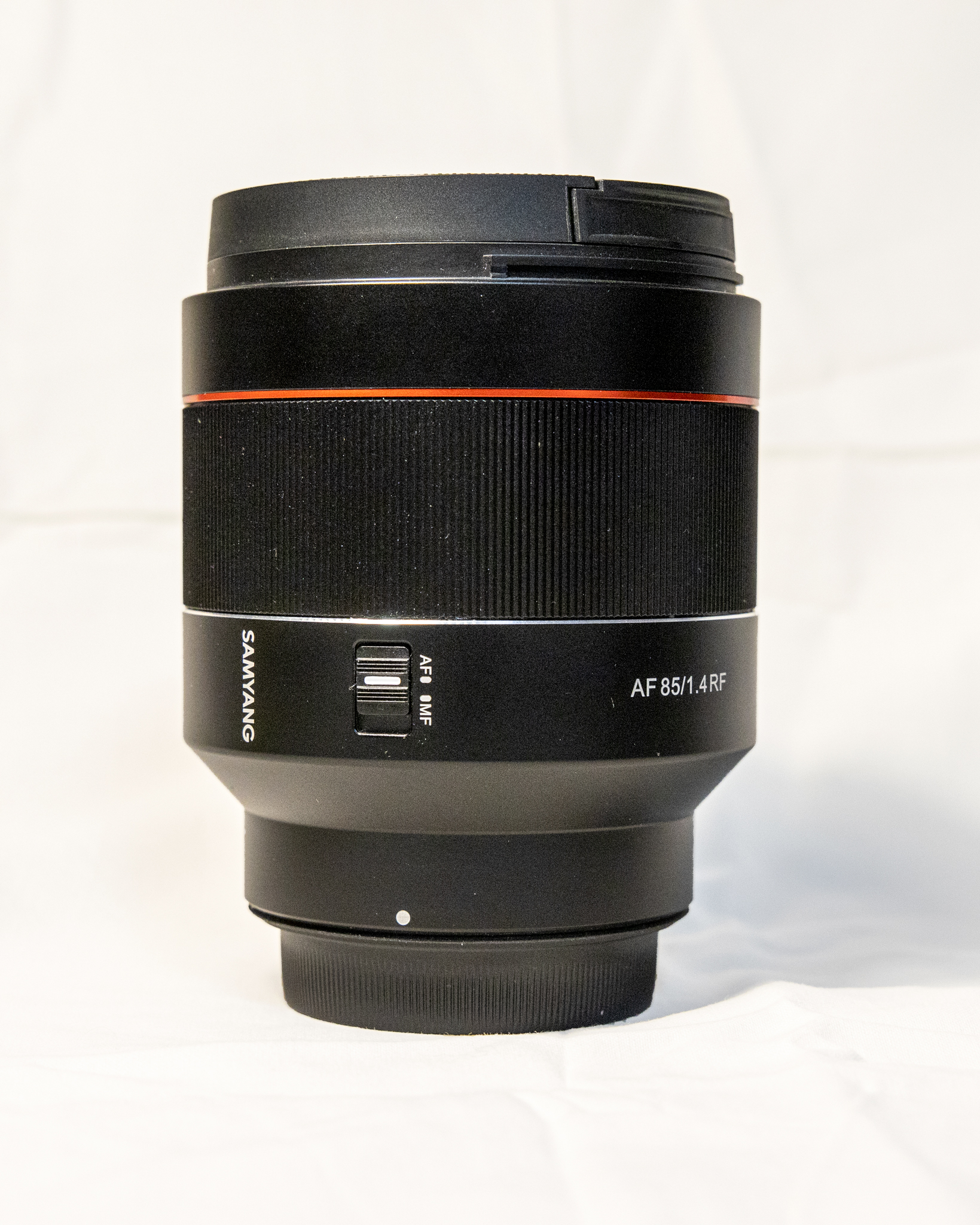
Samyang AF 85 mm f/1.4 RF

For Canon RF Mount:

- AF 12 mm f//2 RF-S
- AF 14 mm f/2.8 RF
- AF 85 mm f/1.4 RF
- AF 14-24mm F2.8 L

For Sony E-Mount:

- AF 14 mm f/2.8 FE
- AF 18 mm f/2.8 FE
- AF 24 mm f/2.8 FE
- AF 35 mm f/1.4 FE
- AF 35 mm f/1.8 FE
- AF 35 mm f/2.8 FE
- AF 45 mm f/1.8 FE
- AF 50 mm f/1.4 FE
- AF 75 mm f/1.8 FE
- AF 85 mm f/1.4 FE
- AF 24-70mm f/2.8 FE
- AF 35-150mm f/2-2.8 FE

For Nikon F Mount:

- AF 14 mm f/2.8 F
- AF 85 mm f/1.4 F

=== Manual focus lenses ===
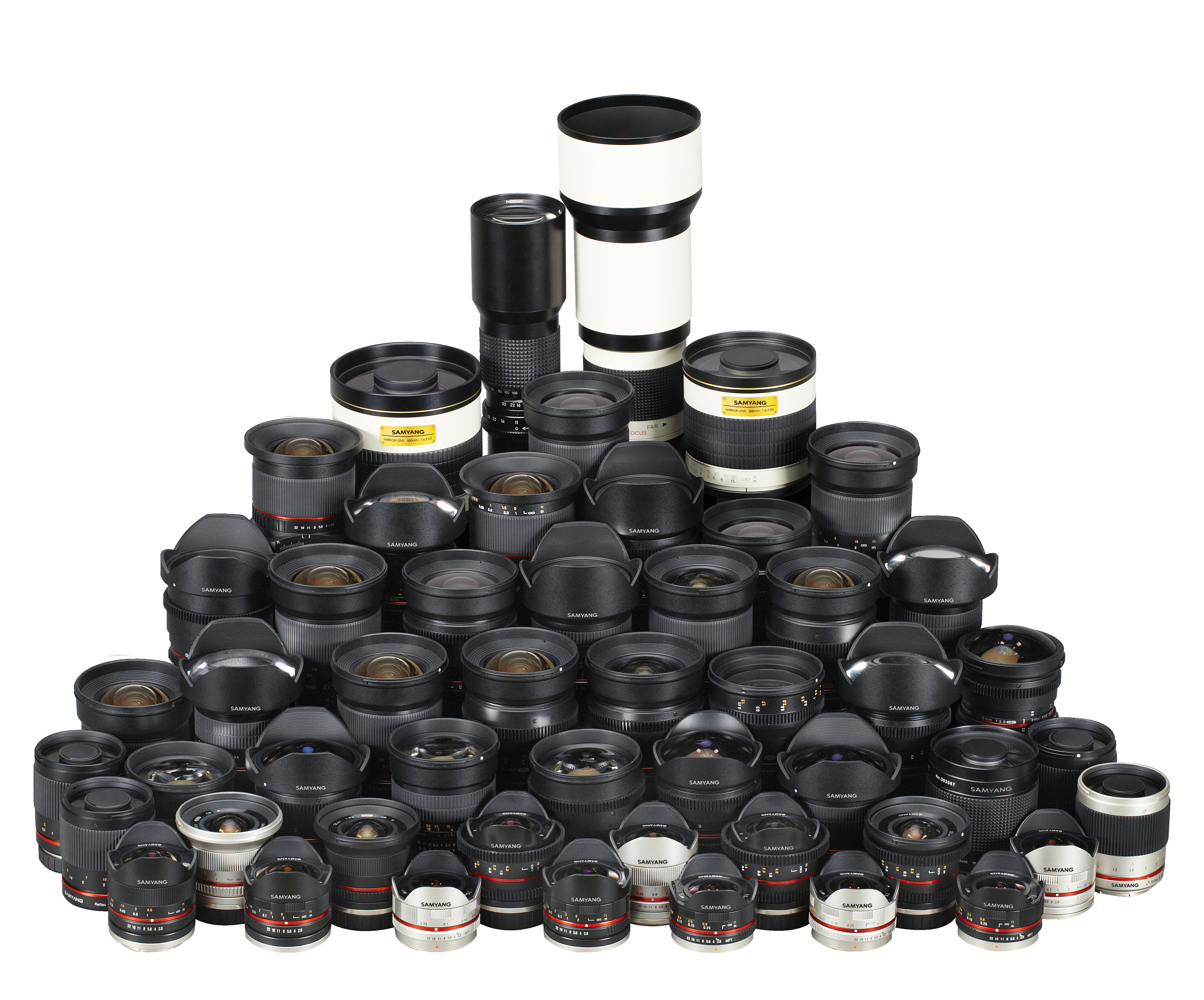
Samyang MF lens

Interchangeable manual focus lenses for 9 different mounts.

- MF 85 mm f/1.4 RF
- MF 14 mm f/2.8 RF
- 85 mm f/1.8 ED UMC CS
- 12 mm f/2.8 ED AS NCS Fish-Eye
- 14 mm f/2.8 ED AS IF UMC
- 20 mm f/1.8 ED AS UMC
- 24 mm f/1.4 ED AS IF UMC
- T/S 24 mm f/3.5 ED AS UMC
- 35 mm f/1.4 AS UMC
- 50 mm f/1.4 AS UMC
- 85 mm f/1.4 AS IF UMC
- 10 mm f/2.8 ED AS NCS CS
- 100 mm f/2.8 ED UMC Macro
- 135 mm f/2.0 ED UMC
- 8 mm f/3.5 UMC Fish-Eye CS II
- 16 mm f/2.0 ED AS UMC CS
- 7.5 mm f/3.5 Fish-Eye
- 8 mm f/2.8 UMC Fish-Eye II
- 12 mm f/2.0 NCS CS
- 21 mm f/1.4 ED AS UMC CS
- 35 mm f/1.2 ED AS UMC CS
- 50 mm f/1.2 AS UMC CS
- 300 mm f/6.3 ED UMC CS

==== DSLRs ====
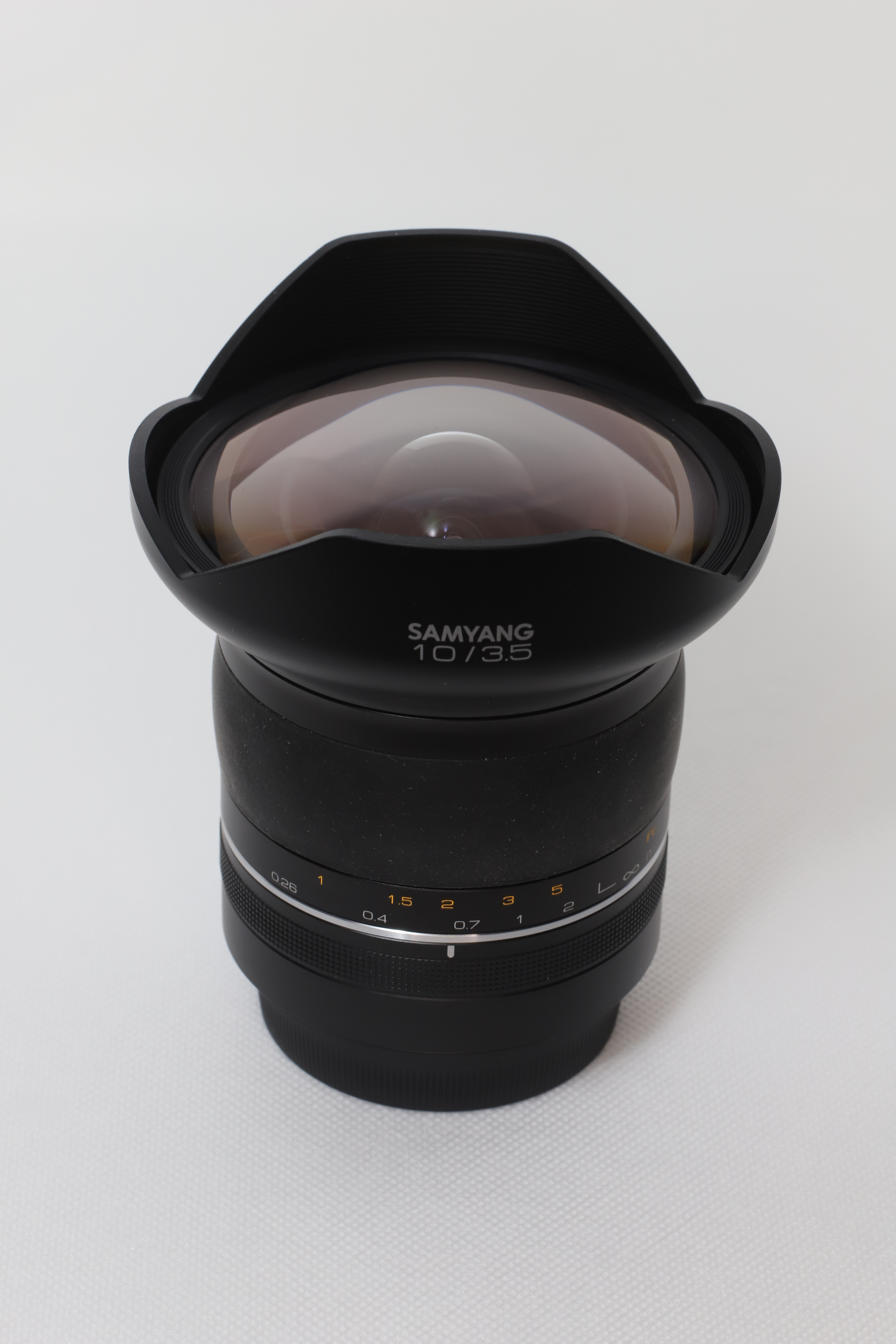
Samyang XP 10 mm f/3.5 ultra wide angle lens for full-frame DSLRs

Premium lenses for DSLRs.

- XP 10 mm f/3.5
- XP 14 mm f/2.4
- XP 35 mm f/1.2
- XP 50 mm f/1.2
- XP 85 mm f/1.2

=== Cinema lenses ===
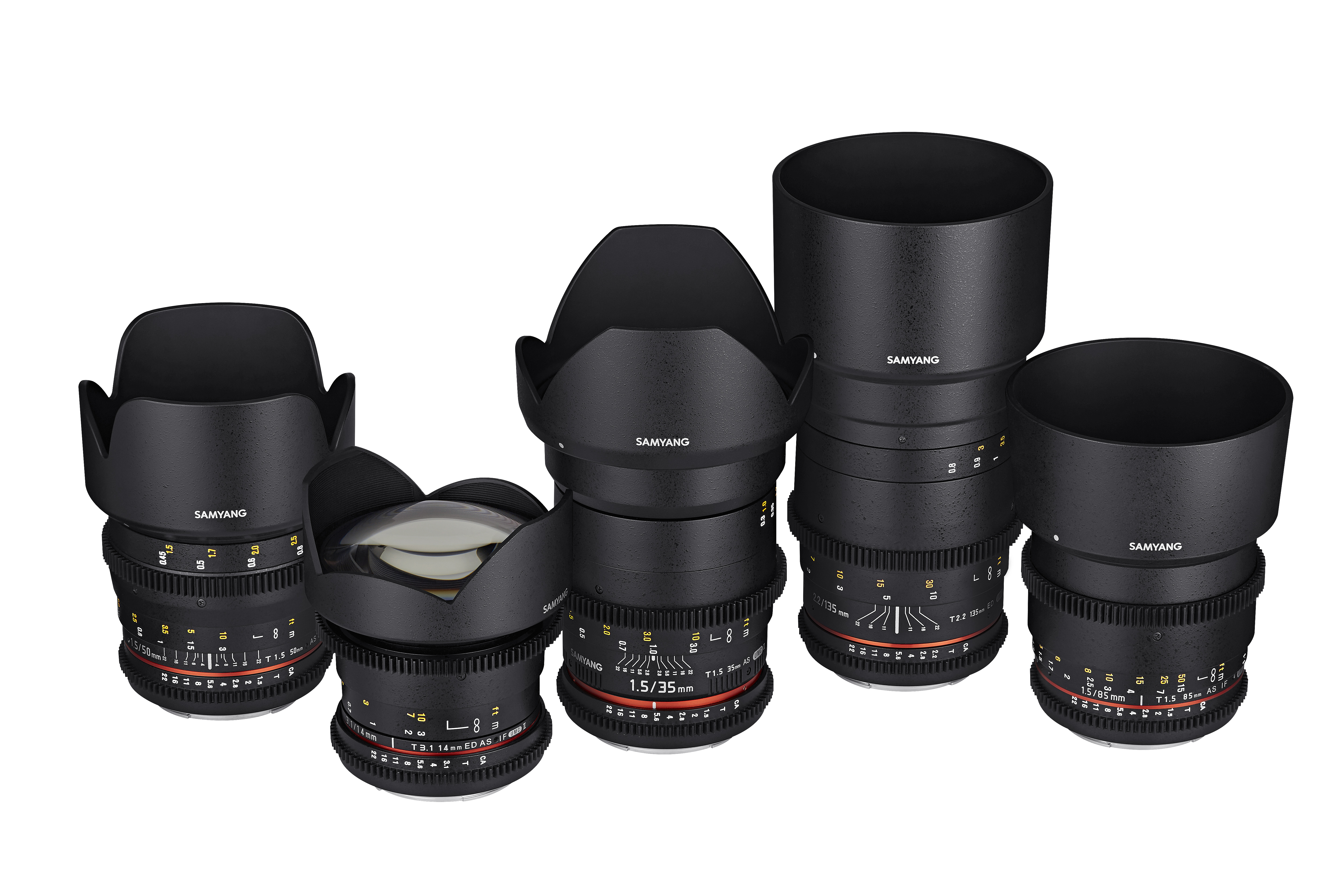
Samyang VDSLR lens

Interchangeable cinema lenses.

- 12 mm T3.1
- 14 mm T3.1
- 16 mm T2.6
- 20 mm T1.9
- 24 mm T1.5
- 35 mm T1.5
- 50 mm T1.5
- 85 mm T1.5
- 100 mm T3.1
- 135 mm T2.2
- 8 mm T3.8
- 10 mm T3.1
- 16 mm T2.2
- 7.5 mm T3.8
- 8 mm T3.1
- 12 mm T2.2
- 21 mm T1.5
- 35 mm T1.3
- 50 mm T1.3

==== Xeen cinema lenses ====
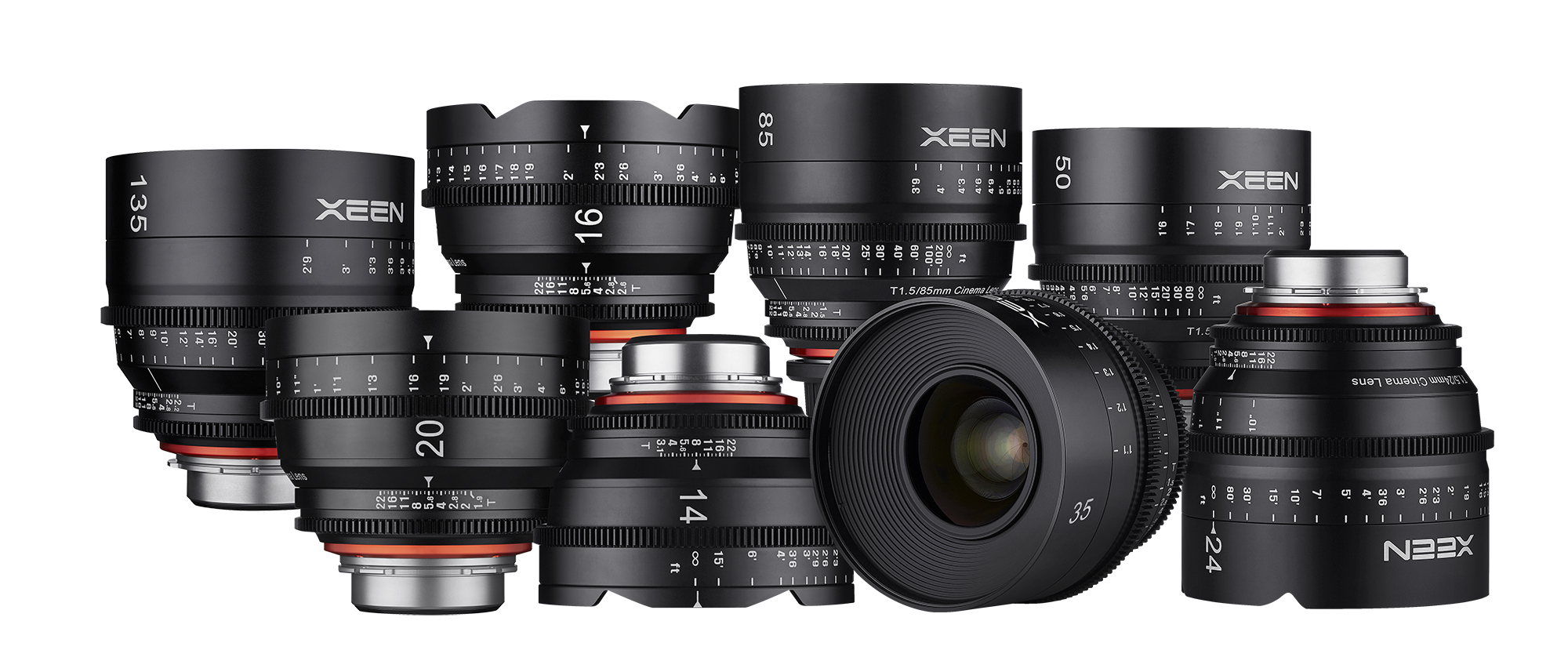
Cinema lens

Cinema lenses are sold under the Xeen brand.

- XEEN 14 mm T3.1
- XEEN 16 mm T2.6
- XEEN 20 mm T1.9
- XEEN 24 mm T1.5
- XEEN 35 mm T1.5
- XEEN 50 mm T1.5
- XEEN 85 mm T1.5
- XEEN 135 mm T2.2

Nikon Z mount

Samyang has produced manual-focus lenses for the Nikon Z mount, including the MF 14mm F2.8 and MF 85mm F1.4. In 2026, the company indicated that it was awaiting an official license from Nikon before producing autofocus lenses for the Z mount, Samyang had previously produced autofocus lenses for Nikon F-mount cameras, but had not introduced autofocus Z-mount lenses.

== Discontinued products ==
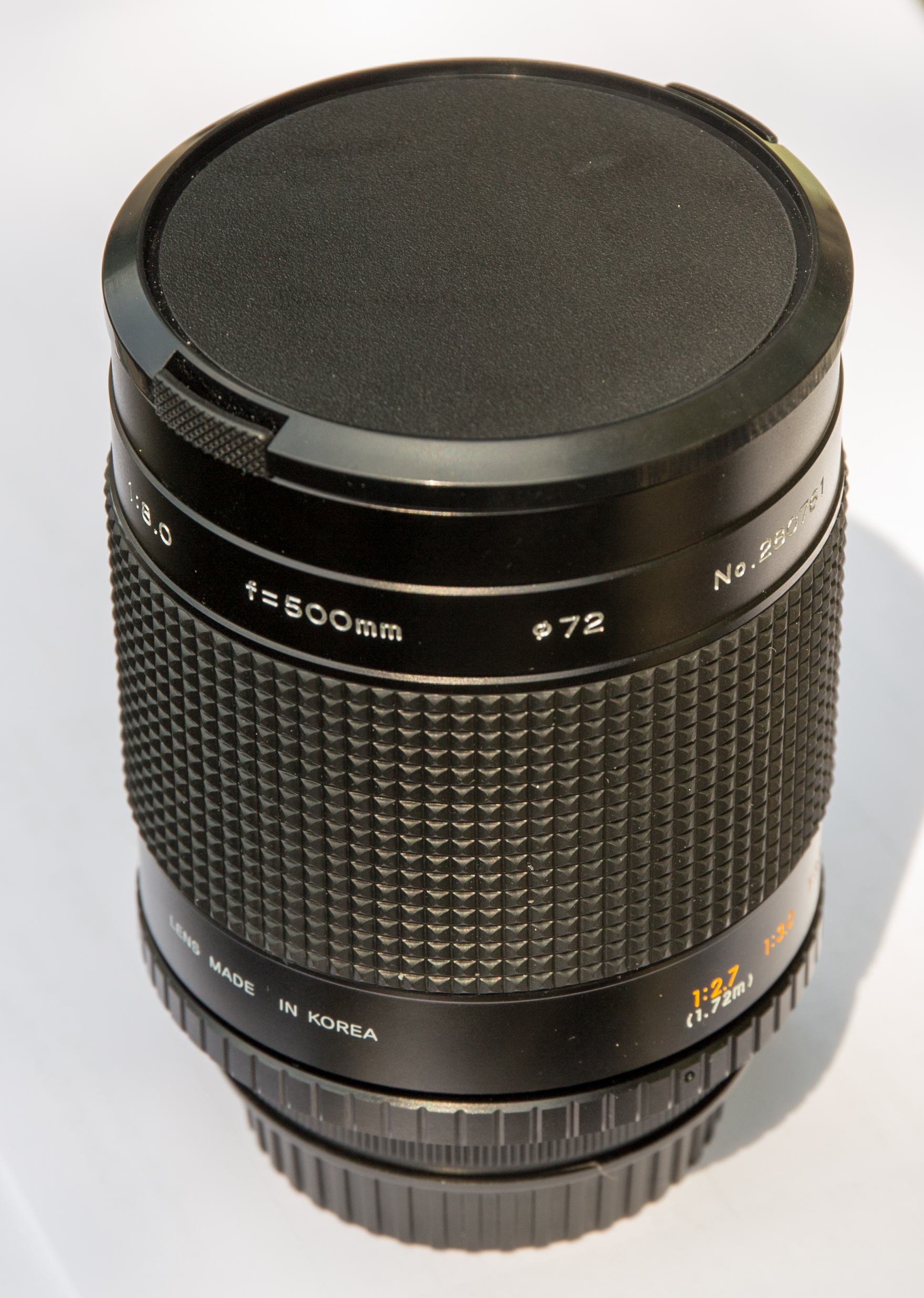
Samyang 500 mm f/8

=== Autofocus zoom lenses ===
For Minolta/Sony A-mount, Nikon AF, Pentax KAF:

- AF 28-70 mm f/3.5-4.5
- AF 28-200 mm f/4-5.6
- AF 35-70 mm f/3.5-4.5
- AF 35-135 mm f/3.5
- AF 70-210 mm f/4-5.6

=== Manual focus prime lenses ===
Manual focus prime T-mount mirror lenses.

- Samyang 300 mm f/6.3 Reflex
- Samyang 330 mm f/5.6
- Samyang 440 mm f/5.6
- Samyang 500 mm f/5.6
- Samyang 500 mm f/6.3
- Samyang 500 mm f//8
- Samyang 500 mm f/8 ED
- Samyang 500 mm f/8 ED Preset
- Samyang 800 mm f/8

==== Zoom ====
- Samyang 650-1300 mm f/8-16

== Awards ==
- 2014 - VIP ASIA Awards : 50 mm T1.5 UMC
- 2015 - GOOD DESIGN : XEEN
- 2016 - E-Photozine 'Gear of the Year' : XP 85 mm
- 2016 - GOOD DESIGN : XP
- 2017 - iF Design Awards
- 2018 - Reddot Design Award
- 2018 - TIPA Awards CSC Prime Lens : AF 35 mm f/2.8 FE
