= Sigma 18-300mm f/3.5-6.3 DC Macro OS HSM lens =

Sigma 18-300mm F3.5-6.3 DC Macro OS HSM
- Maker: Sigma Corporation

Technical data
- Type: Zoom
- Focal length: 18-300mm
- Focal length (35mm equiv.): 27-450mm
- Aperture (max/min): f/3.5-6.3
- Close focus distance: 39cm
- Max. magnification: 1:3
- Diaphragm blades: 7
- Construction: 17 elements in 13 groups

Features
- Ultrasonic motor: Yes Yes
- Lens-based stabilization: Yes Yes
- Application: Travel zoom

Physical
- Diameter: 79mm
- Weight: 585g
- Filter diameter: 72mm

Accessories
- Lens hood: LH780-07 886

History
- Introduction: 2014

Retail info
- MSRP: 579 USD

The Sigma 18-300mm F3.5-6.3 DC Macro OS HSM Contemporary is an APS-C superzoom lens made by Sigma Corporation.
