= Sigma 150-500mm f/5-6.3 DG OS HSM lens =

APO 150-500mm F5-6.3 DG OS HSM
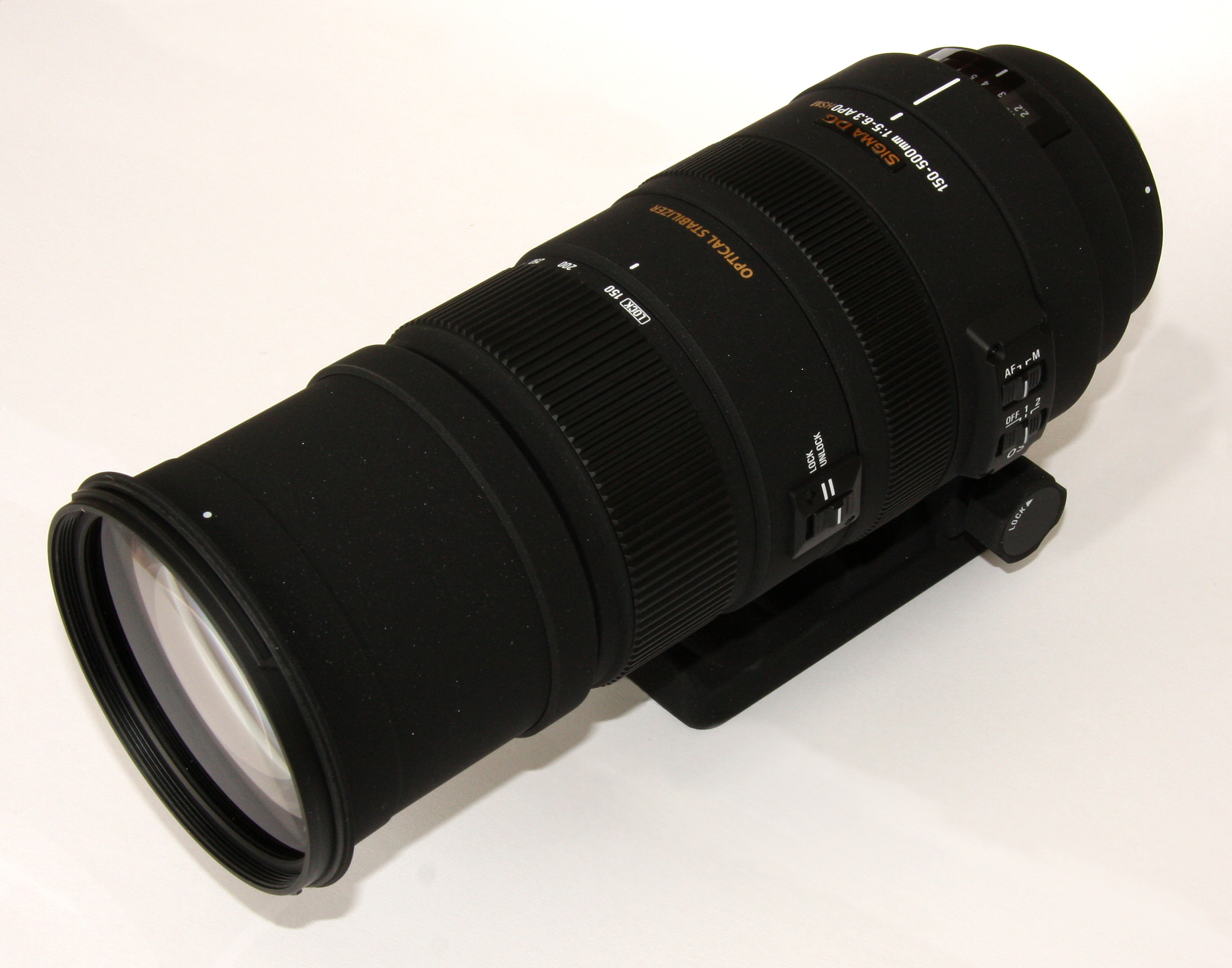
- Maker: Sigma

Technical data
- Type: Super-telephoto zoom
- Focus drive: Ultrasonic motor
- Focal length: 150-500mm
- Crop factor: 1.0
- Aperture (max/min): f/5-6.3-f/22
- Close focus distance: 220cm
- Max. magnification: 1:5.2
- Diaphragm blades: 9
- Construction: 21 elements in 15 groups

Features
- Short back focus: No No
- Lens-based stabilization: Yes Yes
- Macro capable: No No
- Unique features: Hood Adapter provides more effective shading when used on digital cameras with an APS-C size image sensor
- Application: wildlife, animals, sports

Physical
- Max. length: 252mm
- Diameter: 94.7mm
- Weight: 1780g
- Filter diameter: 86mm

Accessories
- Lens hood: LH1030-01

Angle of view
- Diagonal: 46.5-5

History
- Introduction: 2008
- Discontinuation: 2015

Retail info
- MSRP: 1450 USD

The Sigma APO 150-500mm F5-6.3 DG OS HSM lens is a super-telephoto lens produced by Sigma Corporation. It contains three SLD (Special Low Dispersion) glass elements to provide correction for chromatic aberration. It is aimed toward advanced consumer level photographers, and is available in Nikon, Canon, Pentax and Sigma camera mounts.

== Technical information ==
The optical construction consists of 21 lens elements divided into 15 groups. The 9-bladed diaphragm begins at f/5 when shooting wide open, progressing towards f/6.3 at 500mm. As expected with similar long telephoto zoom lenses, optical quality drops off at the extremes of the telephoto range.

Autofocus is achieved using a moderately fast hypersonic motor for quiet operation. Additionally, all focus elements are internal so in operation the front element does not rotate or extend during focusing, which is useful when a polarizing filter is employed.

== Recall ==
In 2010, Sigma recalled some lenses due to a "potential autofocus defect". Sigma offered customers a modification service, free of charge. Lenses requiring the modification were those with serial numbers between 10674301 and 10972000. Sigma lenses APO 50-500mm F4.5-6.3 DG OS HSM and APO 120-400mm F4.5-5.6 DG OS HSM were also affected.

== See also ==
- List of Nikon compatible lenses with integrated autofocus-motor
