= Sigma 8mm f/4 EX DG lens =

Photographic fisheye lens by Sigma Corporation

Sigma 8mm f/4 EX DG
- Maker: Sigma Corporation

Technical data
- Focal length: 8mm
- Diaphragm blades: 5
- Construction: 10 elements in 6 groups

Features
- Unique features: circular fisheye

Physical
- Filter diameter: rear (Gelatin filter)

Angle of view
- Horizontal: 180
- Vertical: 180
- Diagonal: 180

History
- Successor: Sigma 8mm f/3.5 EX DG

The Sigma 8mm f/4 EX DG is a photographic lens made by the Sigma Corporation. It is a circular fisheye lens for full-frame cameras, and has been replaced by the Sigma 8mm f/3.5 EX DG.
