= Sigma 70-300mm f/4–5.6 APO DG Macro lens =

Sigma 70–300 mm APO DG Macro
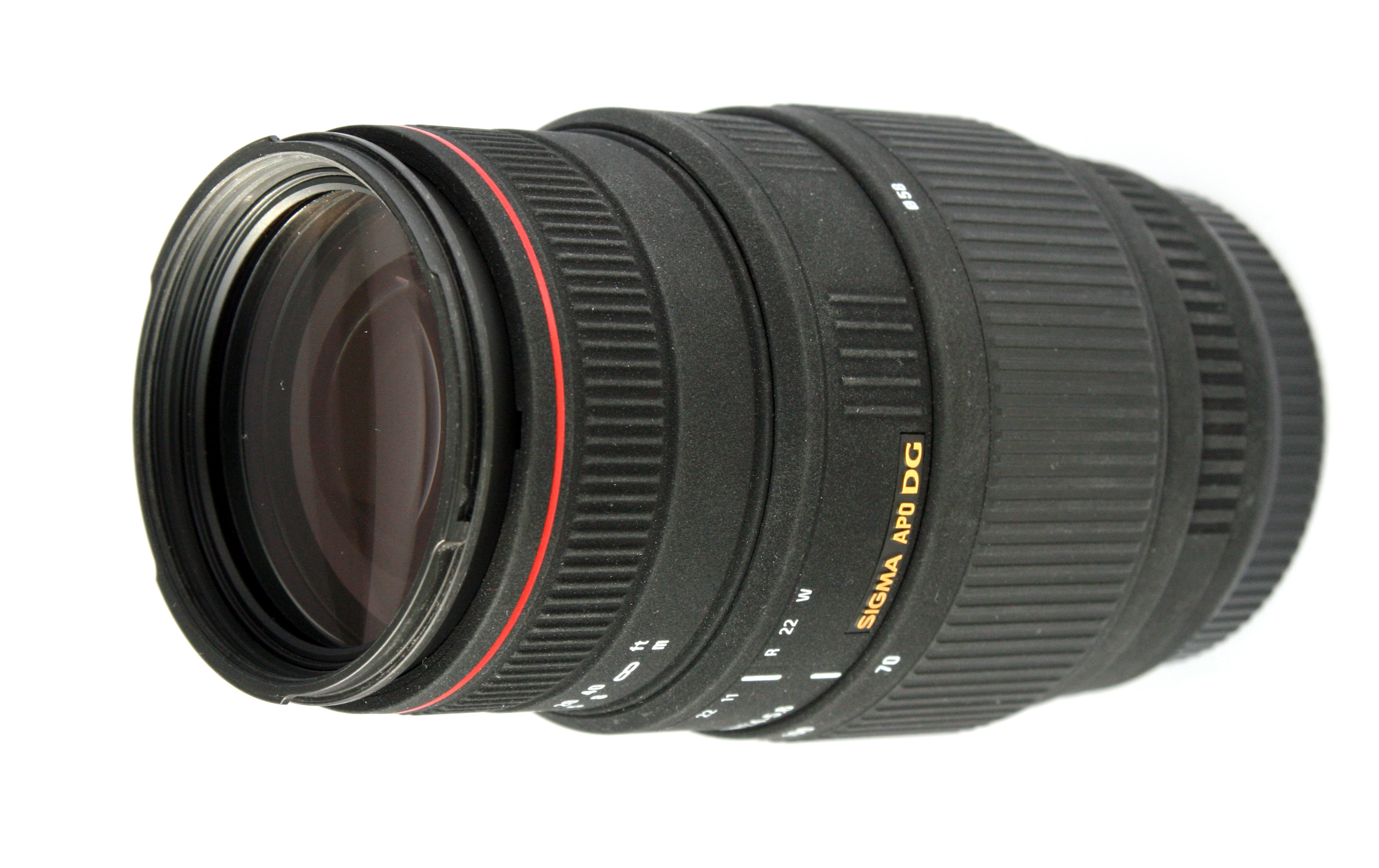
- Maker: Sigma

Technical data
- Type: Zoom
- Focal length: 70–300mm
- Aperture (max/min): f/4 – f/5.6
- Close focus distance: 150cm / (95cm Macro mode)
- Max. magnification: 1:4.1 / 1:2(Macro mode)
- Diaphragm blades: 9
- Construction: 14 elements in 10 groups

Features
- Short back focus: No No
- Ultrasonic motor: No No
- Lens-based stabilization: No No
- Macro capable: Yes Yes
- Application: Consumer Telephoto Zoom

Physical
- Max. length: 122
- Diameter: 76.6
- Weight: 550
- Filter diameter: 58mm

The Sigma 70-300mm F4-5.6 APO DG Macro lens is a consumer-level, telephoto zoom lens made by Sigma Corporation. Different versions of this lens are produced that work with cameras from Canon, Nikon, Pentax, Konica Minolta, Sony and Sigma. Additionally, Olympus' 70–300 f/4–5.6 lens for Four-Thirds has the same optical design and specifications as this lens. The lens is packaged with a lens hood.

Sigma's APO designation signifies an apochromatic lens that uses low dispersion glass to minimize chromatic aberration. The APO version has a red ring on the end of the lens body to distinguish it from the non-APO version of the lens, the Sigma 70-300mm F4-5.6 DG Macro.

This lens has 14 elements in 10 groups including two special low dispersion glass elements in the front lens group, and one in the rear lens group. The non-APO version has only one such element in the rear.

An additional feature to this lens is a macro option between 200–300mm. The minimum focusing distance between 200 and 300mm is 95 cm (37.4 inches). It is enabled by a manual switch and provides a maximum magnification of 1:2.
