= Sigma 150-600mm f/5-6.3 DG OS HSM lens =

Sigma APO 150-600mm F5-6.3 DG OS HSM Sports
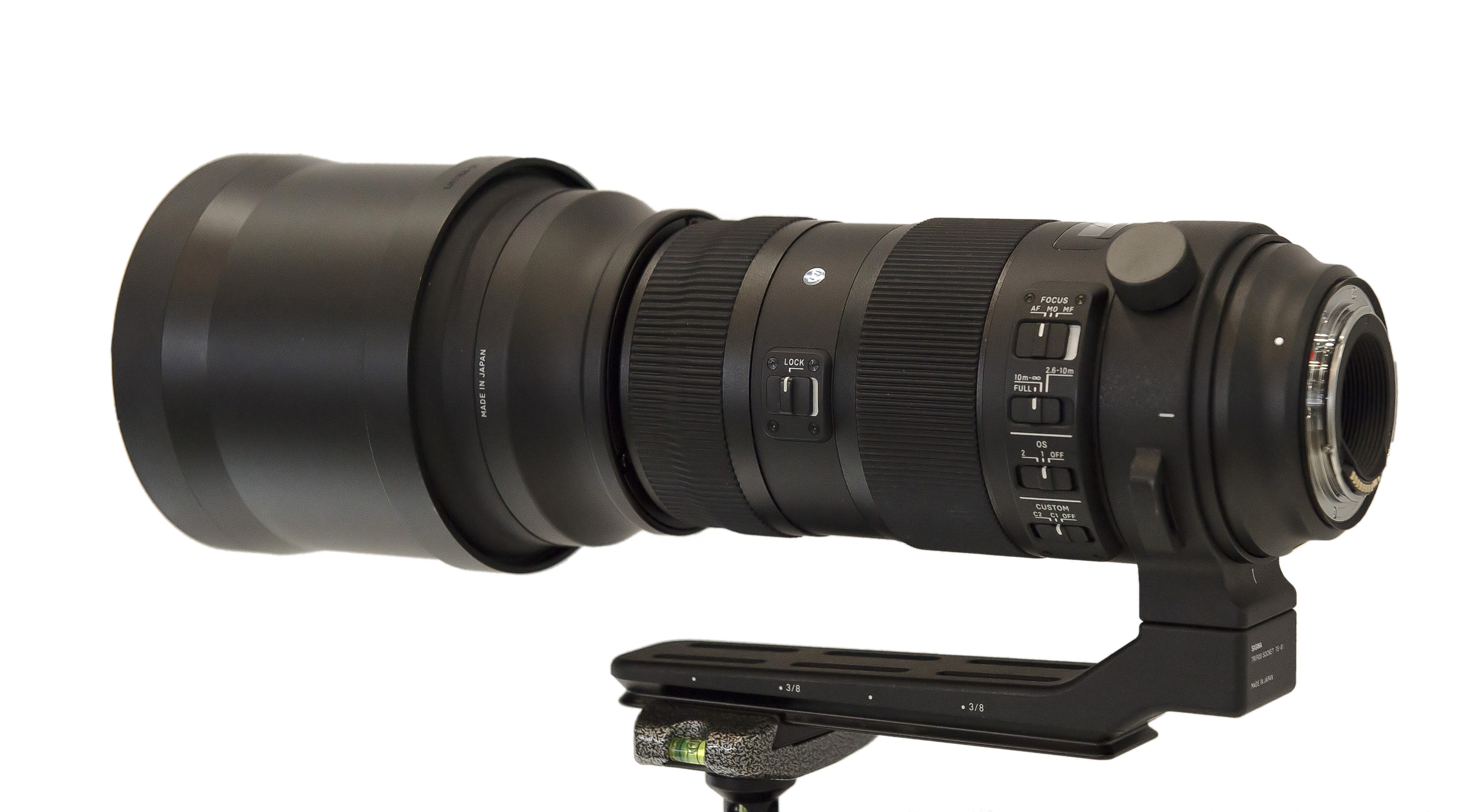
- Maker: Sigma

Technical data
- Type: Super-telephoto zoom
- Focus drive: Ultrasonic motor
- Focal length: 150-600 mm
- Crop factor: 1.0
- Aperture (max/min): f/5-f/22 (@150 mm), f/6.3-f/22 (@600 mm)
- Close focus distance: 260 cm (8.5 ft)
- Max. magnification: 1:5
- Diaphragm blades: 9
- Construction: 24 elements in 16 groups

Features
- Short back focus: No No
- Lens-based stabilization: Yes Yes
- Macro capable: No No
- Application: Sports & wildlife

Physical
- Max. length: 290.2 mm (11.43 in)
- Diameter: 121 mm (4.8 in)
- Weight: 2,860 g (6.31 lb)
- Filter diameter: 105 mm

Accessories
- Lens hood: Circular metal hood included

Angle of view
- Horizontal: 13.7 ° (150 mm) to 3.4 ° (600 mm)
- Vertical: 9.1 ° (150 mm) to 2.3 ° (600 mm)
- Diagonal: 16.4 ° (150 mm) to 4.1 ° (600 mm)

History
- Introduction: Announced September 2014, available October 2014

Retail info
- MSRP: $1999 / £1599 USD

Sigma APO 150-600mm F5-6.3 DG OS HSM Contemporary
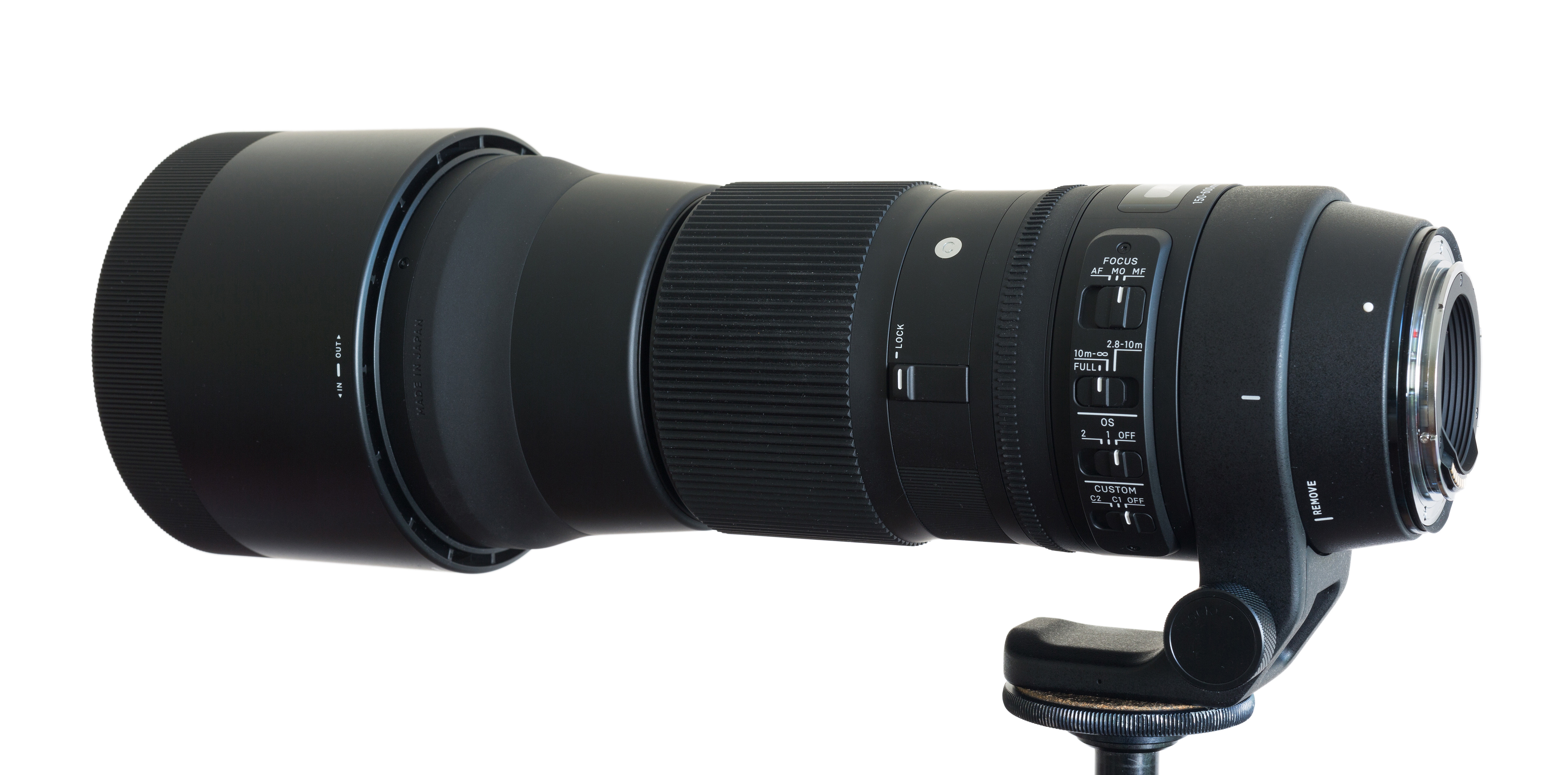
- Maker: Sigma

Technical data
- Type: Super-telephoto zoom
- Focus drive: Ultrasonic motor
- Focal length: 150-600 mm
- Crop factor: 1.0
- Aperture (max/min): f/5-f/22 (@150 mm), f/6.3-f/22 (@600 mm)
- Close focus distance: 280 cm (9.2 ft)
- Max. magnification: 1:4.9
- Diaphragm blades: 9
- Construction: 20 elements in 14 groups

Features
- Short back focus: No No
- Lens-based stabilization: Yes Yes
- Macro capable: No No
- Application: Sports & wildlife

Physical
- Max. length: 260.1 mm (10.24 in)
- Diameter: 105 mm (4.1 in)
- Weight: 1,930 g (4.25 lb)
- Filter diameter: 95 mm

Accessories
- Lens hood: Circular plastic hood included

Angle of view
- Horizontal: 13.7 ° (150 mm) to 3.4 ° (600 mm)
- Vertical: 9.1 ° (150 mm) to 2.3 ° (600 mm)
- Diagonal: 16.4 ° (150 mm) to 4.1 ° (600 mm)

History
- Introduction: Announced September 2014, available March 2015

Retail info
- MSRP: $1089 / £1199 USD

The Sigma APO 150-600mm F5-6.3 DG OS HSM lens is a super-telephoto lens produced by Sigma Corporation.

It is actually a range of two slightly different lenses based on a common design: the Sports and Contemporary. Both lenses feature similar specifications, but there are some notable differences. The Sports model has better weather sealing, more lens elements, a larger size and weight and slightly better optical performance at towards the 600 mm end of its zoom range. The Contemporary model, on the other hand, is built to a cheaper price point but features similar performance. Its performance suffers a little more than the Sport model between 300 and 600 mm.
