= Sigma 50mm f/1.4 DG HSM A lens =

Sigma 50mm f/1.4 DG HSM A
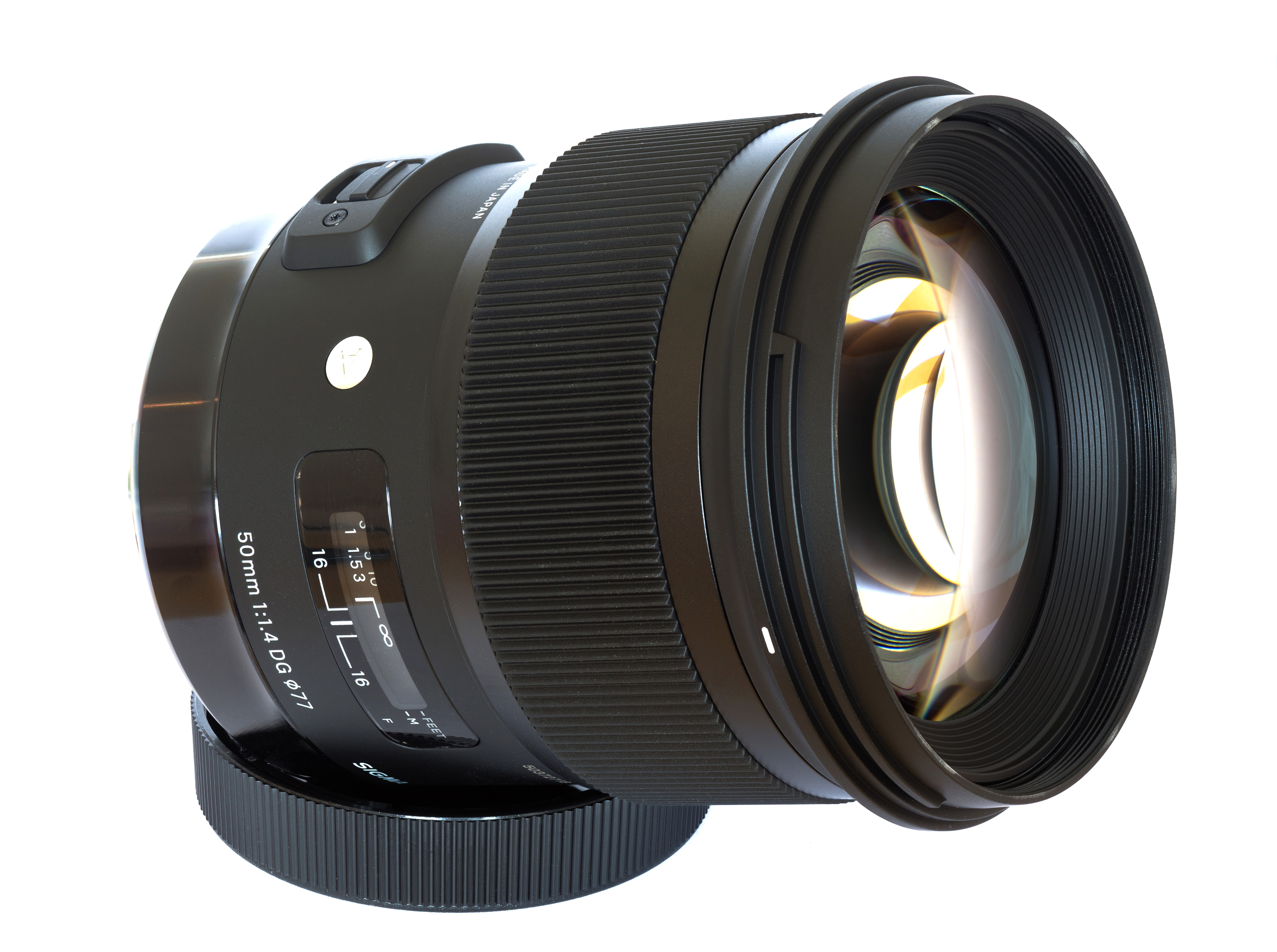
- Maker: Sigma

Technical data
- Type: Prime
- Focus drive: Ultrasonic motor
- Focal length: 50mm
- Crop factor: 1.0
- Aperture (max/min): f/1.4-f/16
- Close focus distance: 40cm
- Max. magnification: 1:5.6
- Diaphragm blades: 9
- Construction: 13 elements in 12 groups

Features
- Short back focus: No No
- Lens-based stabilization: No No
- Macro capable: No No
- Application: Low-light, portrait

Physical
- Max. length: 99.9mm
- Diameter: 85.4mm
- Weight: 815g
- Filter diameter: 77mm

Accessories
- Lens hood: Petal-type included

Angle of view
- Horizontal: 54.4 degrees
- Vertical: 37.8 degrees
- Diagonal: 63.4 degrees

History
- Introduction: Announced January 2014, available June 2014

Retail info
- MSRP: $950 / £850 / €1000 USD

The Sigma 50mm f/1.4 DG HSM Art lens is a professional-level fixed focal length camera lens made by Sigma Corporation. It was announced at CES in January 2014 and immediately became highly anticipated amid reports that Sigma was not aiming to compete against Canon or Nikon's 50mm prime lenses but rather the newly released Zeiss Otus 55/1.4, a lens costing US$4,000. Retail prices for the Sigma 50mm lens had not yet been announced, but it was initially expected that it would sell for around US$1,350. However, when official pricing was announced on April 11, 2014, the retail price was even lower: US$950.

Reviews of the lens have been largely very positive, and there are expectations that it is significantly sharper than the 50mm f/1.4 prime lenses by Canon and Nikon. Chromatic aberration is minimal across the aperture range, as is distortion, and the lens is sharpest at f/5.6, after which it is marginally softer as diffraction effects become more prominent.

Reviews have reported that the lens is sharper and has smoother bokeh than the Canon EF 50mm f/1.2L USM lens.
