= Sigma 70-200mm f/2.8 EX DG OS HSM lens =

Camera lens

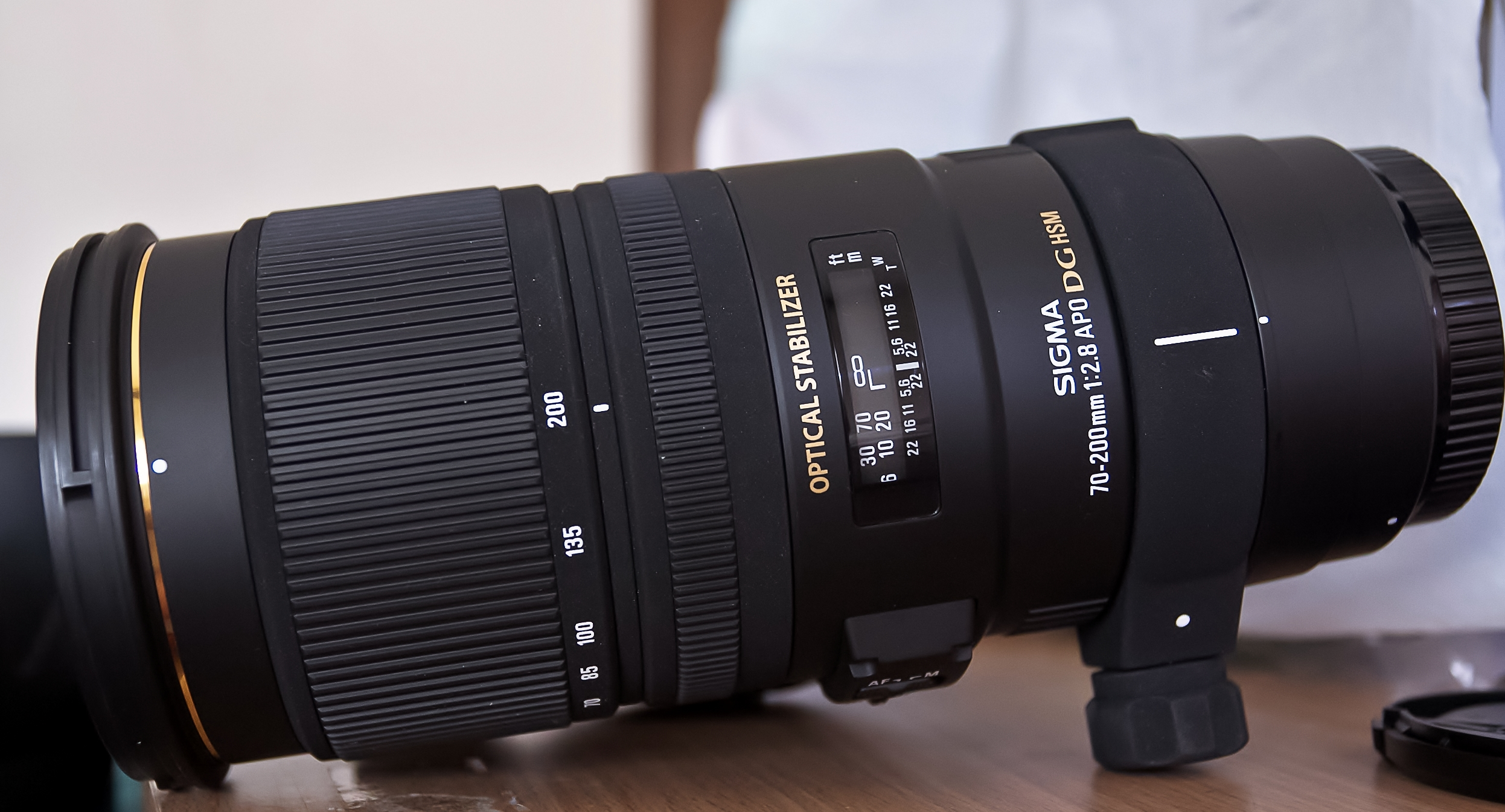
Sigma APO 70-200mm F2.8 EX DG OS HSM

The Sigma 70-200mm f2.8 EX DG OS HSM is a camera lens produced by the Sigma Corporation.

== Features ==
The lens features an Optical Stabiliser function, which in turn enables the use of shutter speeds up to four stops slower than would otherwise be possible. The OS functionality also enables low-light photography. The lens has an ultrasonic motor.

=== Specifications ===
AF	Yes Yes
Corresponding Mounts	Canon HSM EX / Nikon HSM EX / Sigma HSM EX / Sony Minolta HSM EX
Focal Length Range	70-200mm
Maximum aperture	f/2.8
Minimum aperture	f/22
Weight	1430g / 50.4oz
Dimensions (Approx.)	86.4mm x 197.6mm /3.4in. x 7.8in. (Diameter x Length)
Diaphragm Blades	9
Filter diameter	77mm
Maximum Magnifications	1:8
Minimum Focusing Distance	140cm / 55.1in.
Supplied Accessories	LH850-02 589 Hood
Supplied Accessories	Case
Supplied Accessories	77mm lens cap
Supplied Accessories	Rear lens cap
RRP - 2013	$1,249.00
