= Sigma 18-50mm f/2.8-4.5 DC OS HSM lens =

18-50mm f/2.8-4.5 DC OS HSM lens
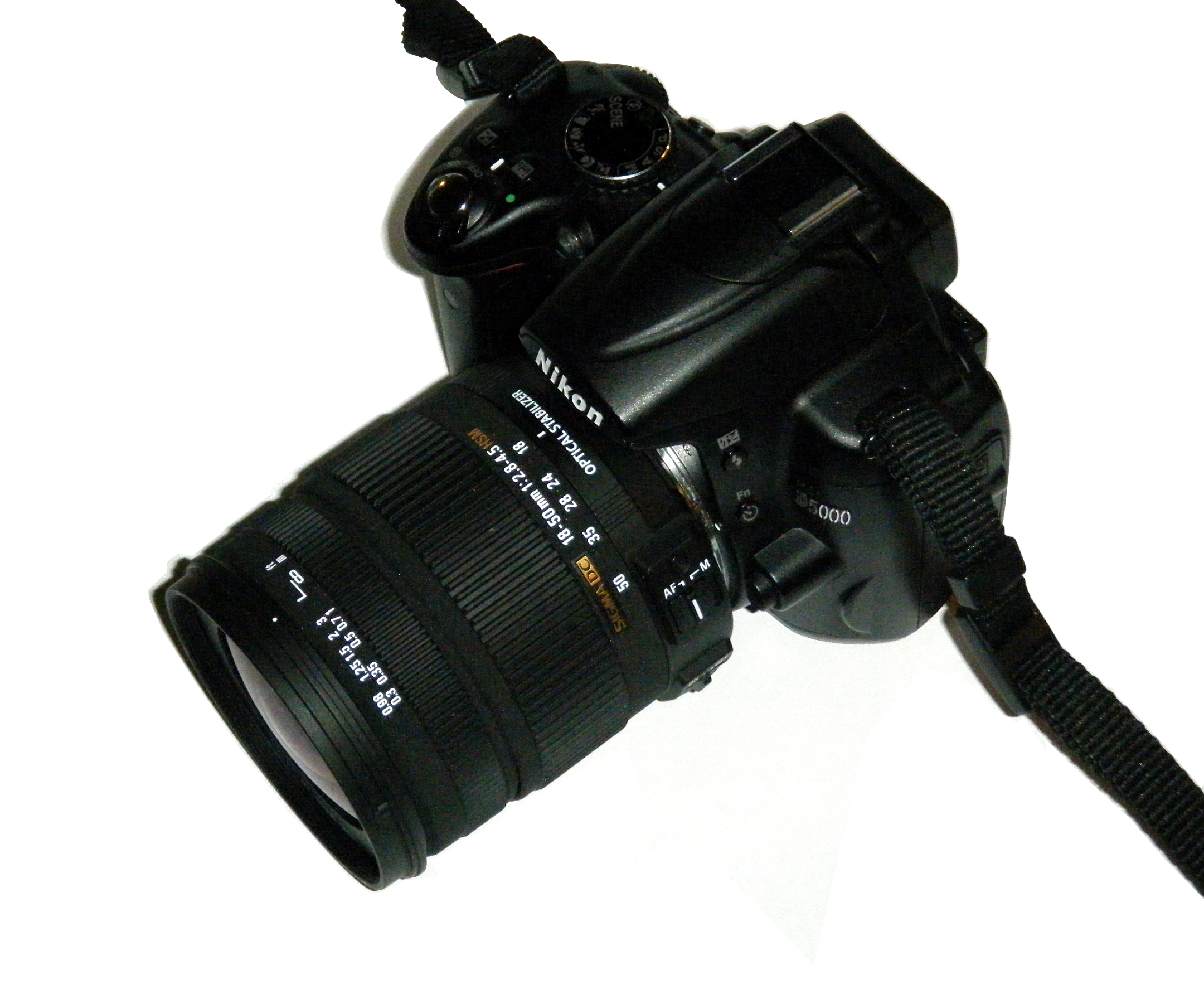
- Maker: Sigma Corporation

Technical data
- Focal length: 18-50mm
- Aperture (max/min): f/2.8 - f/22
- Close focus distance: 30cm
- Max. magnification: 1:4.1
- Diaphragm blades: 7
- Construction: 16 elements in 12 groups

Features
- Short back focus: No No
- Ultrasonic motor: Yes Yes
- Lens-based stabilization: Yes Yes
- Macro capable: No No
- Application: Wide-angle

Physical
- Max. length: 88.6mm
- Diameter: 74mm
- Weight: 395 g
- Filter diameter: 67 mm

Accessories
- Lens hood: Petal

Angle of view
- Diagonal: 69.3° - 27.9°

Retail info
- MSRP: 420.00 USD

The 18-50mm f/2.8-4.5 DC OS HSM is a wide-angle zoom lens produced by Sigma Corporation. The lens has four different variates, fitting on the Canon EF mount, Pentax K mount, Minolta A-mount, and the Nikon F-mount. It features internal focusing and internal zooming, as well as two SLD elements and three aspherical lenses.

== See also ==
- List of Nikon compatible lenses with integrated autofocus-motor
