= Sigma 50mm f/1.4 EX DG HSM lens =

Lens for photographic camera

50mm f/1.4 EX DG HSM
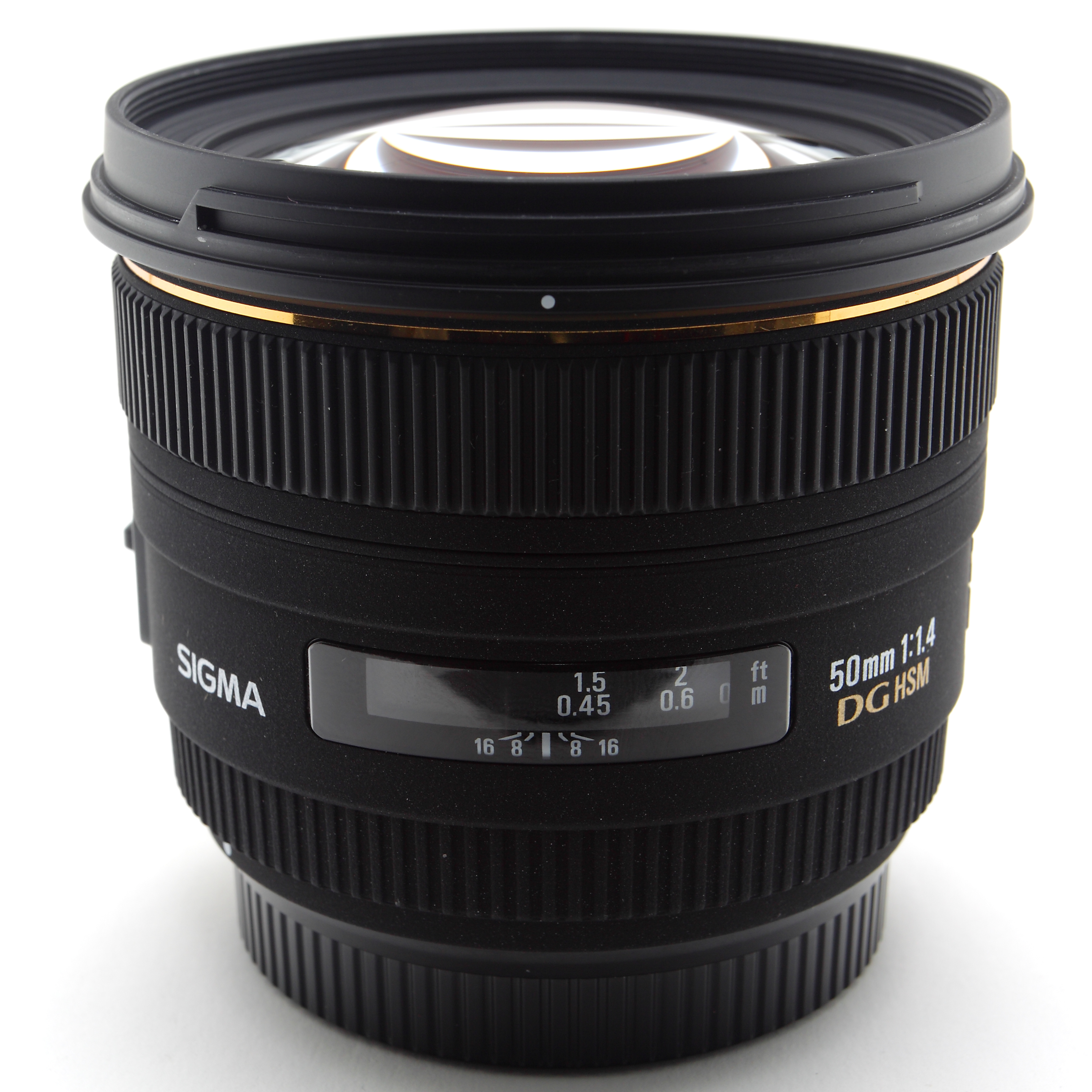
- Maker: Sigma Corporation

Technical data
- Focal length: 50mm
- Aperture (max/min): f/1.4 – f/16
- Close focus distance: 45 cm / 17.7 in.
- Max. magnification: 1:7.4
- Diaphragm blades: 9
- Construction: 8 elements in 6 groups

Features
- Short back focus: No No
- Ultrasonic motor: Yes Yes
- Lens-based stabilization: No No
- Macro capable: No No
- Application: normal prime/portrait

Physical
- Max. length: 68.2mm / 2.7 in.
- Diameter: 84.5 mm / 3.3 in.
- Weight: 505 g / 17.8 oz.
- Filter diameter: 77 mm

Accessories
- Lens hood: Petal

Angle of view
- Diagonal: 45.8°

History
- Introduction: 2008

Retail info
- MSRP: 730.00 USD

The Sigma 50mm f/1.4 EX DG HSM is a normal prime lens made by the Sigma Corporation.

The lens is produced in Canon EF mount, Four Thirds System, Nikon F-mount, Pentax K mount, Sigma's own SA mount, and the Sony/Minolta AF Mount varieties, all have the same optical formula.

== Technical information ==
The Sigma 50mm f/1.4 EX DG HSM is constructed with a plastic body and a metal mount. This lens features a distance window with depth of field scale. A nine-blade, maximum aperture of f/1.4 gives the lens the ability to create shallow depth-of-field effects. The optical construction of this lens contains eight lens elements, including one aspherical lens element. This lens uses a front extension focusing system, powered by a ring USM motor. Auto-focus speed of the lens is moderate; it is not as fast as most ring USM lenses. The front of the lens does not rotate, but does extend when focusing. The lens is designed so that the outer body barrel is longer than the inner lens barrel, when the inner lens barrel is at its longest extension. This results in the lens maintaining the same overall length no matter where the point of focus lies.

When used on a digital crop body with a field of view compensation factor of 2× (Four Thirds body), it provides a field of view equivalent to a 100 mm lens mounted in a 35 mm body. In a 1.6× body, such as the Canon EOS 7D, it provides a narrower field of view, equivalent to an 80 mm lens mounted on a 35 mm frame body. With a 1.5× body such as the Nikon D300, it provides a less narrow field of view, equivalent to a 75 mm lens mounted on a 35 mm frame body. With a 1.3× body such as the Canon EOS-1D Mark III, it provides an even less narrow field of view, equivalent to a 65 mm lens mounted on a 35 mm frame body.

== Advantages & Problems ==
This lens has shown to have lower vignetting than other Canon 50mm lenses. It has been reported that quality control problems lead to some copies of this lens having problems attaining proper focus when using auto focus.

== See also ==
- List of Nikon F-mount lenses with integrated autofocus motors

Kind	Type	Focal length	Aperture	2000s							2010s							
Kind	Type	Focal length	Aperture	03	04	05	06	07	08	09	10	11	12	13	14	15	16	17
Prime	Fish-eye	8	3.5				Olympus Zuiko Digital 8mm F3.5											
Prime	Norm.	24	1.8				Sigma 24mm F1.8 EX DG											
Prime	Norm.	25	1.4					Leica D Summilux 25mm F1.4 ASPH										
Prime	Norm.	25	2.8						Olympus Zuiko Digital 25mm F2.8									
Prime	Norm.	30	1.4				Sigma 30mm F1.4 EX DC HSM											
Prime	Norm.	35	3.5			Olympus Zuiko Digital 35mm F3.5 Macro												
Prime	Tele	50	1.4						Sigma 50mm F1.4 EX DG HSM									
Prime	Tele	50	2.0	Olympus Zuiko Digital ED 50mm F2.0 Macro														
Prime	Tele	105	2.8				Sigma 105mm F2.8 EX DG Macro											
Prime	Tele	150	2.0							Olympus Zuiko Digital ED 150mm F2								
Prime	Tele	150	2.8				Sigma 150mm F2.8 EX DG APO Macro HSM											
Prime	Super tele	300	2.8		Olympus Zuiko Digital ED 300mm F2.8													
Zoom	UWA	7-14	4.0			Olympus Zuiko Digital ED 7-14mm F4												
Zoom	UWA	9-18	4–5.6						Olympus Zuiko Digital ED 9-18mm F4-5.6									
Zoom	UWA	10-20	4–5.6						Sigma 10-20mm F4.0-5.6 EX DC HSM									
Zoom	UWA	11-22	2.8–3.5		Olympus Zuiko Digital 11-22mm F2.8-3.5													
Zoom	Std.	12-60	2.8–4							Olympus Zuiko Digital ED 12-60mm F2.8-4 SWD								
Zoom	Std.	14-xx	2.0			Olympus Zuiko Digital ED 14-35mm f/2.0 SWD												
Zoom	Std.	14-xx	2.8-3.5	Olympus Zuiko Digital 14-54mm F2.8-3.5					Olympus Zuiko Digital 14-54mm F2.8-3.5 II									
Zoom	Std.	14-xx	2.8-3.5						Leica D Vario-Elmarit 14-50mm F2.8-3.5 ASPH									
Zoom	Std.	14-xx	3.5-5.6		Olympus Zuiko Digital 14-45mm F3.5-5.6													
Zoom	Std.	14-xx	3.5-5.6					Leica D Vario-Elmar 14-150mm F3.5-5.6 ASPH										
Zoom	Std.	14-xx	3.8-5.6				Leica D Vario-Elmar 14-50mm F3.8-5.6 ASPH											
Zoom	Std.	17,5-45	3.5-5.6			Olympus Zuiko Digital 17.5-45mm F3.5-5.6												
Zoom	Std.	18-50	2.8				Sigma 18-50mm F2.8 EX DC											
Zoom	Std.	18-50	3.5-5.6		Sigma 18-50mm F3.5-5.6 DC													
Zoom	Std.	18-125	3.5-5.6				Sigma 18-125mm F3.5-5.6 DC											
Zoom	Std.	18-180	3.5–6.3				Olympus Zuiko Digital ED 18-180mm F3.5-6.3											
Zoom	Tele	35-100	2.0			Olympus Zuiko Digital ED 35-100mm F2												
Zoom	Tele	50-500	4.0-6.3							Sigma 50-500mm F4-6.3 EX DG HSM								
Zoom	Tele	5x-200	2.8-3.5	Olympus Zuiko Digital ED 50-200mm f/2.8-3.5				Olympus Zuiko Digital ED 50-200mm F2.8-3.5 SWD										
Zoom	Tele	5x-200	4-5.6						Sigma 55-200mm F4-5.6 DC									
Zoom	Tele	70-200	2.8							Sigma 70-200mm F2.8 EX DG Macro II HSM								
Zoom	Tele	70-300	4-5.6					Olympus Zuiko Digital ED 70-300mm F4-5.6										
Zoom	Tele	40-150	3.5-4.5		Olympus Zuiko Digital 40-150mm F3.5-4.5													
Zoom	Tele	40-150	4-5.6				Olympus Zuiko Digital ED 40-150mm F4-5.6											
Zoom	Super Tele	90-250	2.8			Olympus Zuiko Digital ED 90-250mm F2.8												
Zoom	Super Tele	135-400	4.5-5.6					Sigma 135-400mm F4.5-5.6 DG APO										
Zoom	Super Tele	300-800	5.6					Sigma 300-800mm F5.6 EX DG HSM APO										
Teleconverter					Olympus Zuiko Digital 1.4x Teleconverter EC-14													
Teleconverter					Olympus Zuiko Digital 2x Teleconverter EC-20													
Extension tube					Olympus Extension Tube EX-25													
Kind	Type	Focal length	Aperture	03	04	05	06	07	08	09	10	11	12	13	14	15	16	17
Kind	Type	Focal length	Aperture	2000s							2010s							
