= Sigma 35 mm f/1.4 DG HSM lens =

Sigma 35 mm f/1.4 DG HSM A
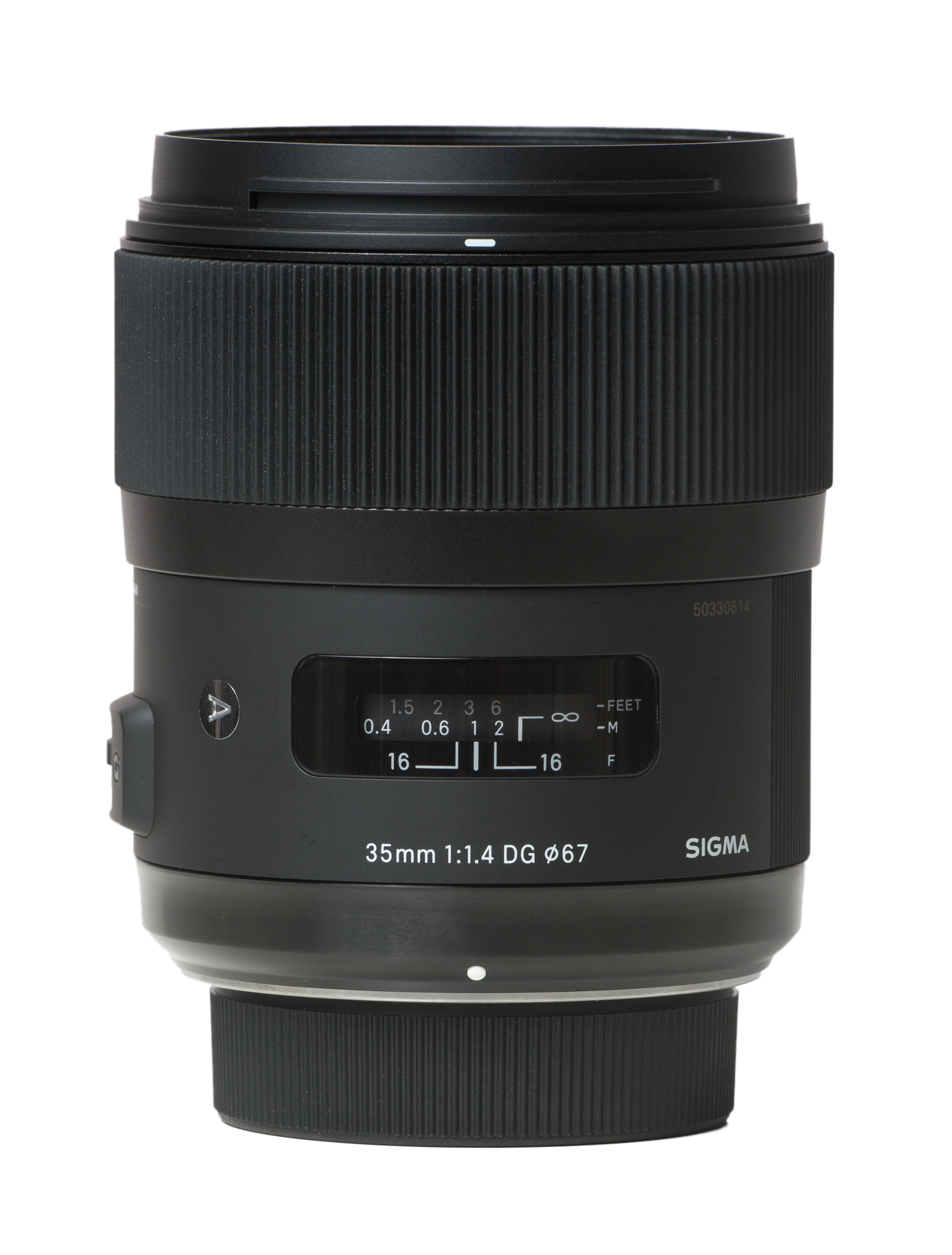
- Maker: Sigma Corporation

Technical data
- Focal length: 35 mm
- Crop factor: 1.0
- Aperture (max/min): f/1.4 - f/16
- Close focus distance: 300 mm / 11.8 in.
- Max. magnification: 1:5.2
- Diaphragm blades: 9
- Construction: 13 elements in 11 groups

Features
- Short back focus: No No
- Ultrasonic motor: Yes Yes
- Lens-based stabilization: No No
- Macro capable: No No
- Application: Wide prime

Physical
- Max. length: 94 mm / 3.7 in.
- Diameter: 77 mm / 3 in.
- Weight: 665 g / 23.5 oz.
- Filter diameter: 67 mm

Accessories
- Lens hood: Petal

Angle of view
- Diagonal: 63.4°

History
- Introduction: 2013

Retail info
- MSRP: 899.00 USD

The Sigma 35 mm f/1.4 DG HSM Art is a wide-angle prime lens made by the Sigma Corporation. The lens was announced at the 2012 photokina trade fair.

The lens is produced in Canon EF mount, Nikon F-mount, Pentax K mount, Sigma's own SA mount, and the Sony/Minolta AF Mount varieties, all have the same optical formula. Since the lens covers full-frame sensors and includes an ultrasonic autofocus motor, it is fully compatible with most DSLRs on which it can be mounted physically. Reviews have noted excellent sharpness and an overall performance on par with manufacturers such as Nikon and Canon, despite its price being significantly less than comparable offerings by those companies.

The Art series of Sigma lenses can be connected to Sigma's USB dock, allowing the lens firmware to be updated and focus micro-adjustments to be configured at four different focus distances.

== See also ==
- List of Nikon F-mount lenses with integrated autofocus motors
