= Sigma 12-24mm f/4.5-5.6 lens =

12-24mm F4.5-5.6
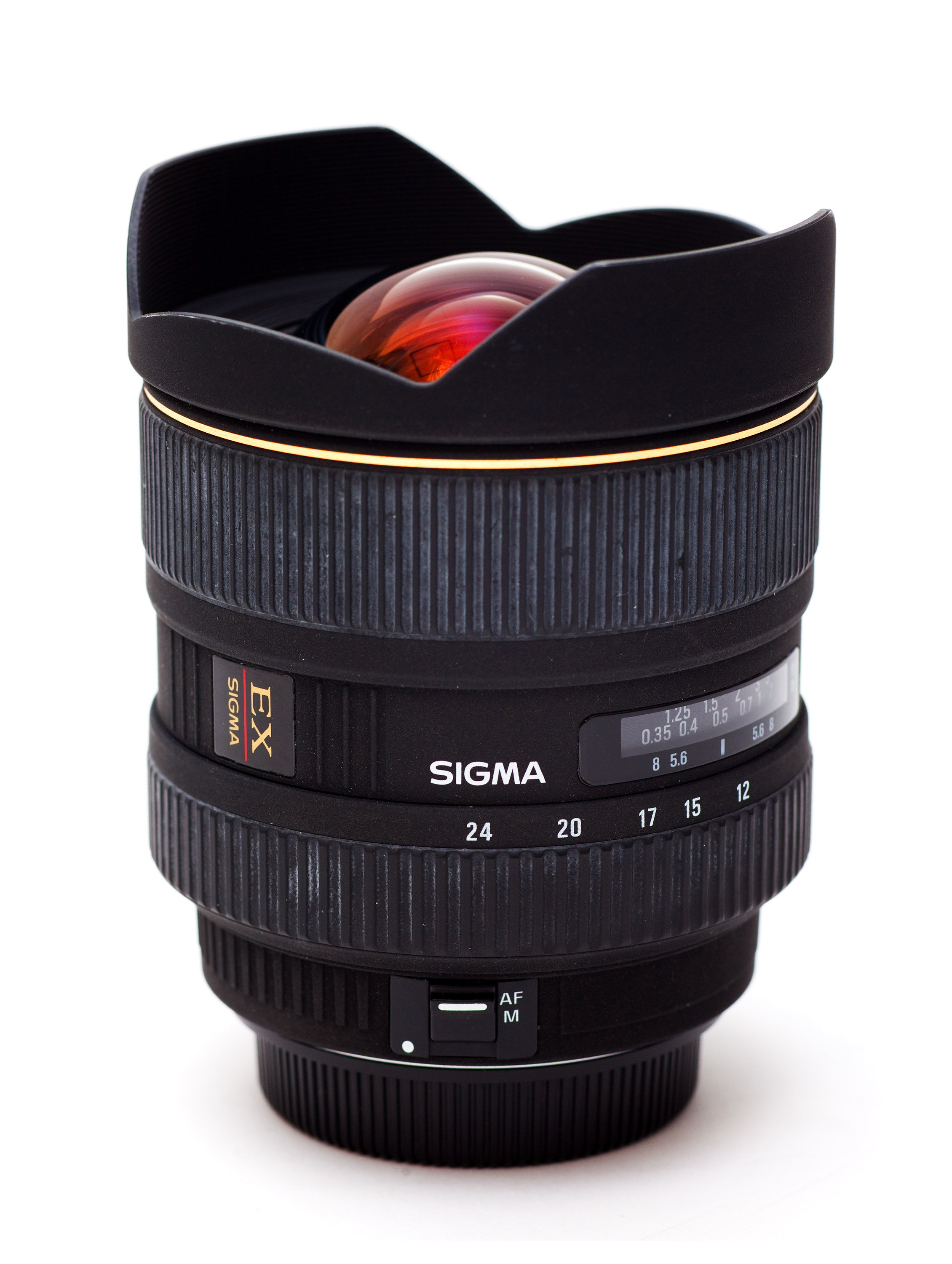
- Maker: Sigma

Technical data
- Type: Zoom
- Focal length: 12-24mm
- Crop factor: 1.0
- Aperture (max/min): f/4.5-f/22
- Close focus distance: 28cm
- Max. magnification: 1:7.1
- Diaphragm blades: 6
- Construction: 16 elements in 12 groups

Features
- Short back focus: No No
- Ultrasonic motor: Yes Yes
- Lens-based stabilization: No No
- Macro capable: No No
- Application: Landscape

Physical
- Max. length: 102.5mm
- Diameter: 87mm
- Weight: 600g
- Filter diameter: rear gelatin

Accessories
- Lens hood: built-in

Angle of view
- Diagonal: 122 to 84.1 degrees

History
- Introduction: June 2003

Retail info
- MSRP: 1050 USD

The Sigma 12-24mm f/4.5-5.6 EX DG HSM is a professional-level wide-angle zoom lens made by Sigma Corporation. At launch it was the widest rectilinear lens available for full-frame 35mm SLR cameras, providing a field of view of 122 degrees. It has since been surpassed by the Canon EF 11-24mm f/4L zoom lens and the Irix 11mm f/4, a manual focus prime lens. The Sigma 12-24 has low distortion even compared to less wide zooms like the Canon EF 16-35mm lens.

This lens is available in Canon, Nikon, and Sigma, Pentax, and Sony mounts. HSM focusing is available only in the Canon, Nikon, and Sigma variants. The build quality is typical of Sigma EX lenses, with a painted metal lens barrel and damped focus and zoom rings. As expected for a lens of these specifications, there is a bulbous front element.

== See also ==
- List of Nikon compatible lenses with integrated autofocus-motor
