= Sigma Corporation =

Japanese camera and camera lens manufacturer

- Native name: 株式会社シグマ
- Type: Private KK
- Industry: Electronics
- Founded: Setagaya, Japan (September 1961; 65 years ago)
- Founder: Michihiro Yamaki
- Headquarters: Asao-ku, Kawasaki, Kanagawa 215-8530, Japan
- Key people: Kazuto Yamaki (CEO)
- Products: Camera lenses; Digital cameras; Optical equipment
- Number of employees: 1,827
- Subsidiaries: Foveon
- Website: Official website

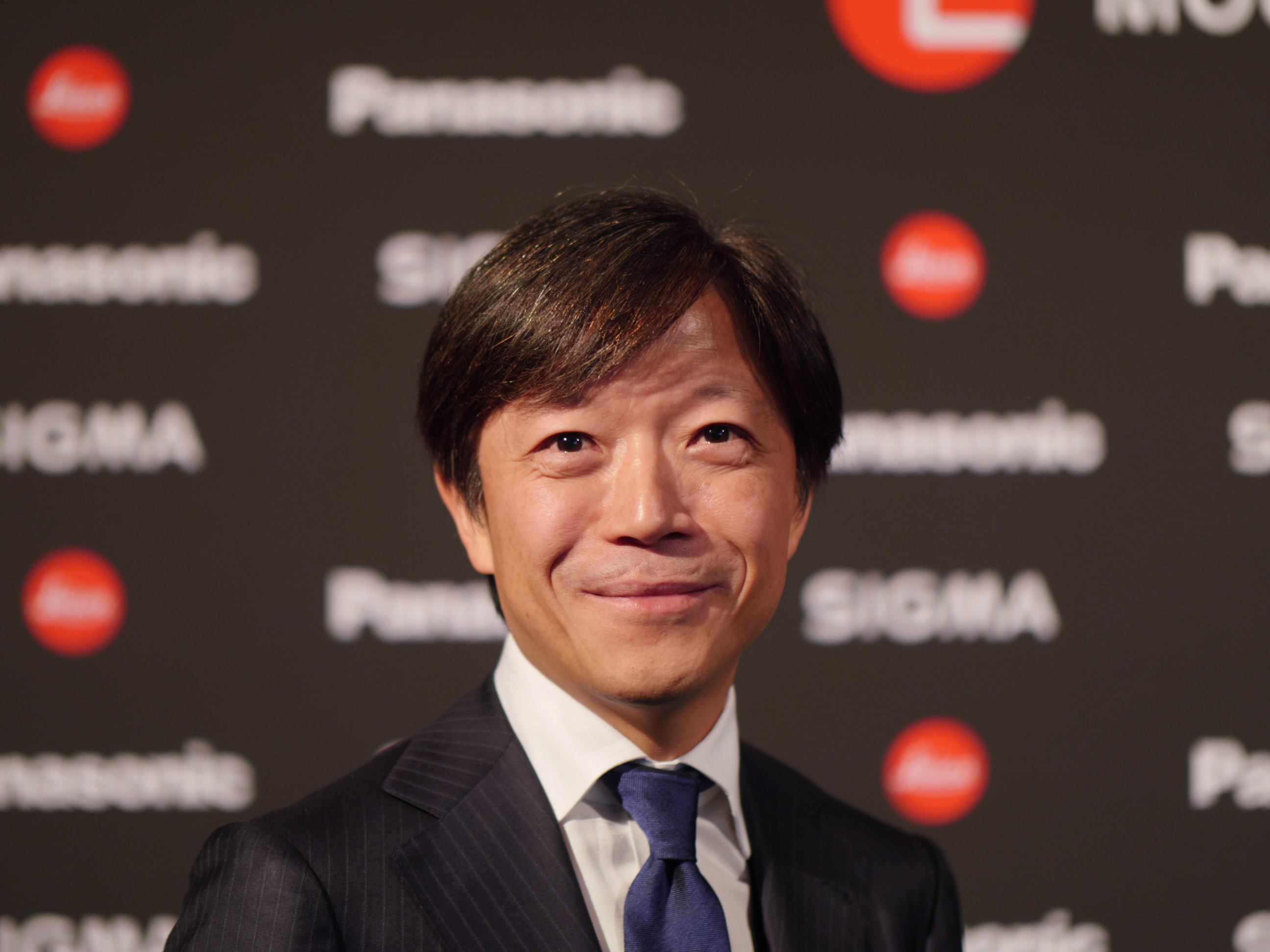
Kazuto Yamaki (CEO of Sigma) on 25 September 2018 at photokina in Cologne

Sigma Corporation (株式会社シグマ, Kabushiki-gaisha Shiguma) is a Japanese company, manufacturing cameras, lenses, flashes and other photographic accessories. All Sigma products are produced in the company's own Aizu factory in Bandai, Fukushima, Japan. Although Sigma produces several camera models, the company is best known for producing high-quality lenses and other accessories that are compatible with the cameras produced by other companies.

The company was founded in 1961 by Michihiro Yamaki, who was Sigma's CEO until his death at age 78 in 2012.

Sigma products work with cameras from Canon, Nikon, Fujifilm, Pentax, Sony, Olympus and Panasonic, as well as their own cameras.

Sigma has also made lenses under the Quantaray name, which have been sold exclusively by Ritz Camera. Similarly, Sigma lenses were sold exclusively by the former Wolf Camera, but following the merger of Wolf and Ritz, both brands could be purchased.

Sigma's digital SLRs, the SD9, SD10, SD14 and SD15, plus the latest SD1 are unusual in their use of the Foveon X3 image sensor. The company's mirrorless cameras, the Sigma SD Quattro and SD Quattro H, use the Foveon Quattro sensor, an updated version of the Foveon X3. All use the SA lens mount. The Sigma DP series of high-end compact P&S cameras also use the Foveon Quattro sensor, which gives them a much larger sensor than other cameras of this type.

In September 2018 Sigma became one of the founding members of the L-Mount Alliance; it announced that it will cease to develop SA-mount cameras and instead use the Leica L-Mount. A new full-frame mirrorless camera, Sigma FP, was launched in 2019 along with a range of L-Mount lenses and adapters.

Sigma is the world's largest independent lens manufacturer and is a family-owned business.

== Cameras ==
Up until the Sigma FP, all Sigma SLR, DSLR, and mirrorless cameras used the Sigma SA mount, which is mechanically similar to the Pentax K mount and electrically an adaptation of the Canon EF lens mount lens control system.

Sigma has been one of the first companies to experiment with putting the Foveon X3 sensor in consumer digital cameras. During photokina 2010, Sigma announced a new flagship DSLR camera, the SD1, featuring a 46MP Foveon X3 sensor. In recent years their DSLR range has been discontinued in favor of mirrorless designs.

=== Film Cameras ===
Sigma has made a number of film SLR cameras, including the SA-300, SA-5, SA-7 and SA-9.

=== Digital Cameras ===
==== Sigma DP ====
Sigma also produced the DP series of high-end compact digital cameras. The Foveon APS-C sized sensors were similar to those used in the DSLR line. The most-recent line made use of the Quattro sensor, a variant of the Foveon design that had higher resolution top layers and lower resolution lower layers combined into a final image, claimed to be equivalent to a 39 megapixel color filter array image. The four compact cameras were differentiated by their fixed prime lens, with the ultra wide DP0, the wide DP1, the normal DP2 and the telephoto DP3.

==== Sigma SD Quattro & SD Quattro H ====
In February 2016, Sigma announced two new mirrorless cameras—the SD Quattro and SD Quattro H. Both cameras used the full-depth Sigma SA mount, allowing the use of existing SA-mount lenses, and also used Foveon Quattro sensors. The SD Quattro uses an APS-C sensor with 19.6 MP in the top layer, while the SD Quattro H used an APS-H (1.35x crop) sensor with 25.5 MP in the top layer. The company claimed that the Foveon Quattro technology produced a level of detail equivalent to that of a Bayer sensor with twice the pixel count.

==== Sigma fp ====
In July 2019, Sigma announced the Sigma fp, a small form-factor, 24.6MP full-frame mirrorless camera. At the time of launch it was the world's smallest. This was followed by the FP-L in 2021 with a 61mp sensor. Both cameras were able to shoot up to 14-bit RAW video.

==== Sigma BF ====
In April 2025, Sigma announced the launch of the Sigma BF camera, said to stand for "Beautiful Foolishness". The user interface is intentionally minimal, utilizing only three buttons and one dial. The BF camera is equipped with a 24-megapixel full frame back-illuminated CMOS sensor. As Sigma is part of the L Mount alliance, the Sigma BF is fitted with an L mount. Uniquely, the BF camera relies primarily on 230GB of internal storage rather than typical memory card slots.

== Software ==
Sigma produces multiple software packages for use with their cameras and lenses.

- SIGMA Photo Pro - Software for post-production of their camera's .X3F raw image format. It is available both for Mac OS and Microsoft Windows.
- SIGMA Optimization Pro - Software for updating lens firmware and performing calibration and customization.
- SIGMA Capture Pro - Software allowing remote control and image capture from select Sigma cameras.

== Lenses ==
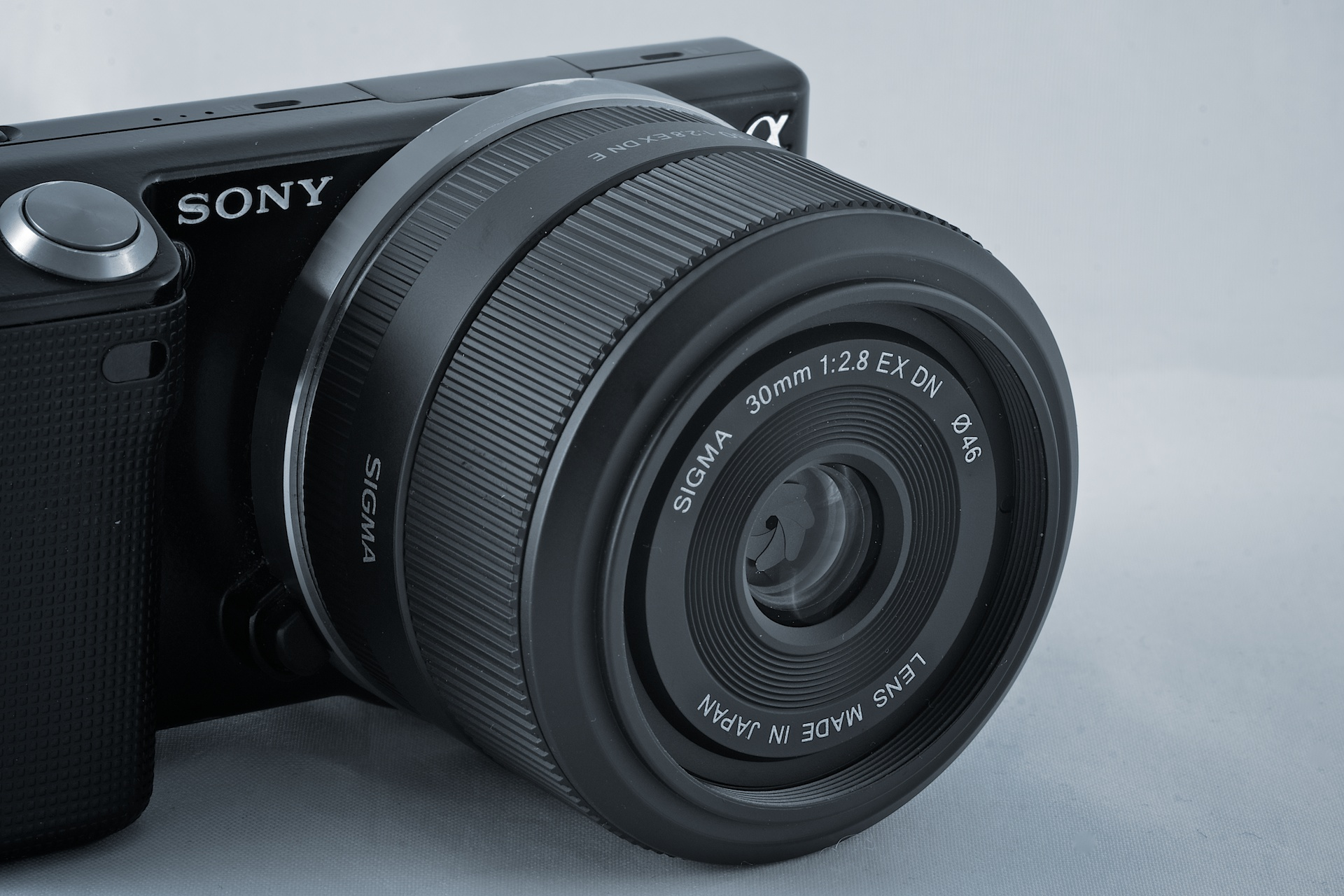
Sony NEX-5 with Sigma 30mm F2.8 EX DN lens.

Sigma makes autofocus lenses for the Sigma SA, Canon EF and RF, Nikon F and Z, Fujifilm X, Minolta/Sony α and E, Pentax K, Leica L, Four Thirds, and Micro Four Thirds lens mounts. Each lens may not be available in all mounts, and may lack certain features (such as HSM) on certain mounts.

In August 2013, Sigma announced that starting the following month, it would offer a mount conversion service for its newest "Global Vision" lenses—those with either an "A" (Art), "C" (Contemporary), or "S" (Sport) as part of their model name. For a cost that varies with lens and market—from $80 to $250 in the U.S., not including shipping costs—owners can send their lenses to their local Sigma company, which in turn sends them to Japan for mount replacement, including calibration and optimization for the new camera system. Lenses designed for DSLRs can be converted to Canon EF, Nikon F, Pentax K, Sigma SA, or Sony A mounts; those designed for MILCs can be converted to Micro Four Thirds or Sony E-mount.

=== Designations ===
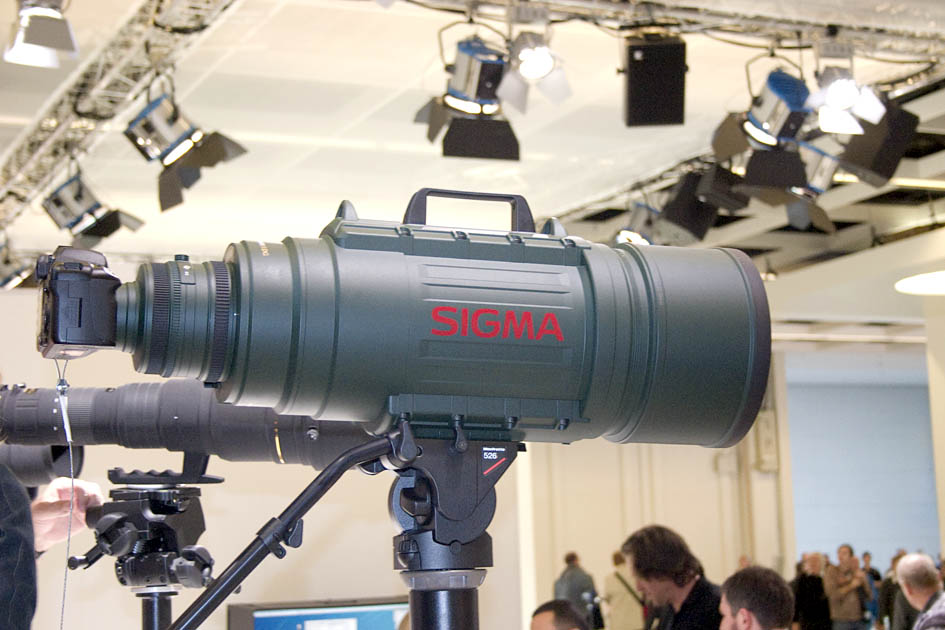
Sigma 200–500mm F2.8 EX DG displayed at the 2008 photokina

- A — "Art Series", large aperture prime and zoom lenses, high optical performance. USB dock compatible. Part of 2013 lens lineup restructuring.
- APO — Apochromatic lens element(s), originally for "Advanced Performance Optics", not necessarily apochromatic
- ASP — Aspherical lens elements
- C — "Contemporary Series", combining optical performance with compactness. USB dock compatible. Part of 2013 lens lineup restructuring.

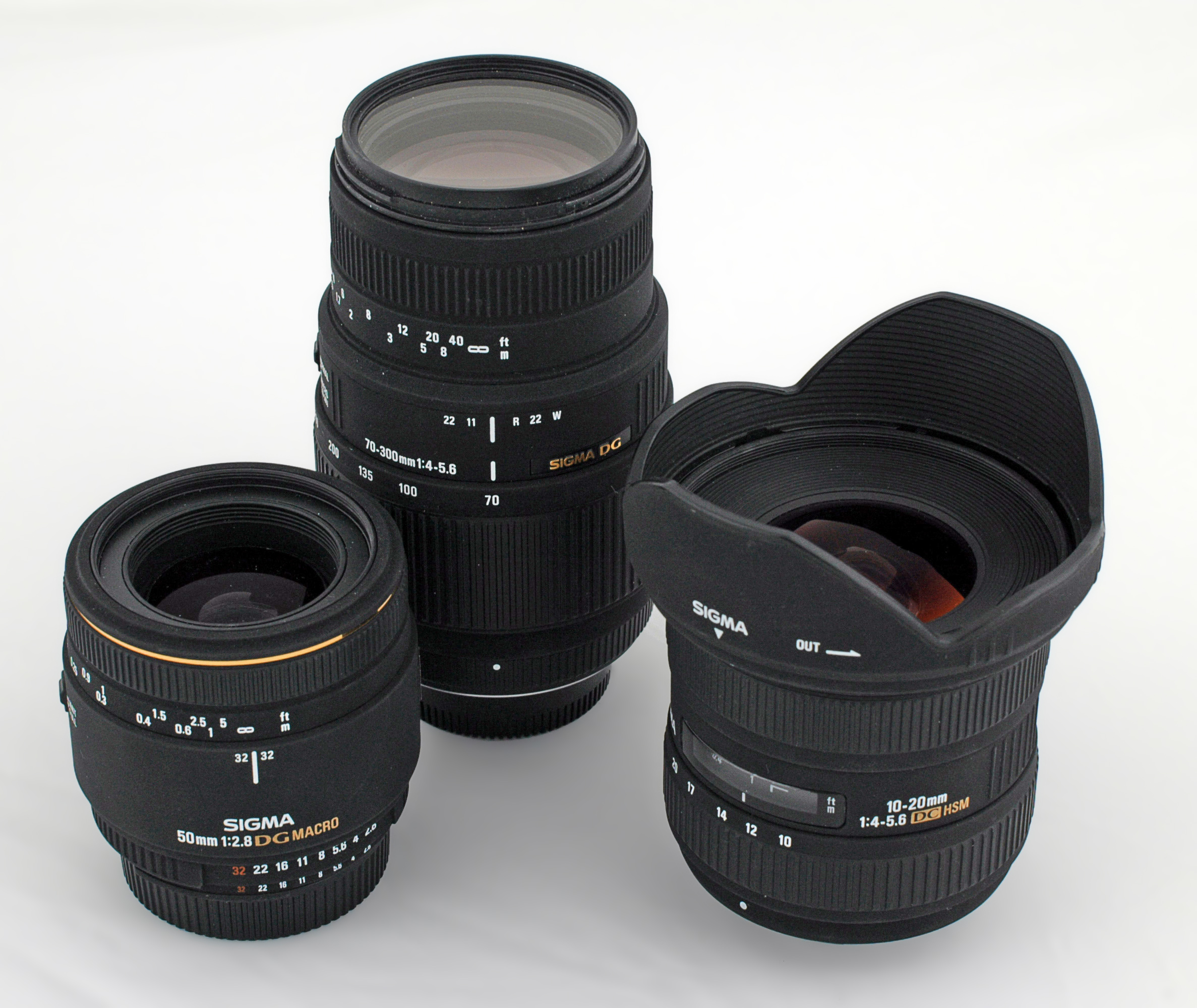
Sigma macro, telephoto and wide angle lenses (left to right)

- DC — "Digital Compact", lenses only for cameras featuring APS-C size sensors
- DF — "Dual Focus", lens features clutch to disengage focus ring when in AF mode
- DG — "Digital Grade", coatings optimized for DSLRs, full-frame as well as APS-C, also usable on 35mm film SLRs
- DL — "Deluxe", indicates lower-end film era lenses
- DN — "Digital Neo", lenses for mirrorless interchangeable-lens cameras (no longer used)
- EX — "Excellence", EX-finish, high performance series.
- FLD — "'F' Low Dispersion" glass, the highest level low dispersion glass available with extremely high light transmission. This glass has a performance equal to fluorite glass which has a low refractive index and low dispersion compared to current optical glass
- HF — "Helical Focusing", front element of lens does not rotate (useful for polarizing filters and petal lens hoods)
- HSM — "Hyper-Sonic Motor", either in-lens ultrasonic motor or micro-motor, analogous to Nikon SWM (AF-S) (ultra-sonic or micro-motor), Canon USM (ultrasonic or micro-motor), Minolta/Konica Minolta/Sony SSM (ultrasonic motor) or Sony SAM (micro-motor), etc.
- IF — "Inner Focusing", length of lens does not change during focusing, no rotating front elements
- OS — In-lens "Optical Stabilization", analogous to Nikon VR or Canon IS
- RF — "Rear Focusing", lenses employing rear-focusing, no length changes during focussing, no rotating front elements
- S — "Sports Series", telephoto and super-telephoto lenses. USB dock compatible. Part of 2013 lens lineup restructuring.
- UC — "Ultra-Compact"

=== Zoom lenses ===
==== Wide-angle zooms ====
Focal length	Aperture	EX	full-frame	HSM	Series	Note
8–16mm	f/4.5-5.6	No	No	Yes		
10–18mm	f/2.8	No	No	No	C	DN
10–20mm	f/4-5.6	Yes	No	Yes		
10–20mm	f/3.5	Yes	No	Yes		
12–24mm	f/4.5-5.6	Yes	Yes	Yes		Aspherical
12–24mm II	f/4.5-5.6	No	Yes	Yes		Aspherical
12–24mm	f/4	No	Yes	Yes	A	
14-24mm	f/2.8	No	Yes	No	A	DN
14-24mm	f/2.8	No	Yes	Yes	A	
15–30mm	f/3.5–4.5	Yes	Yes	No		Aspherical
16-28mm	f/2.8	No	Yes	No	C	DN
17–35mm	f/2.8–4	Yes	Yes	Yes		Aspherical
18–35mm	f/3.5-4.5	No	No	No		Aspherical
20–40mm	f/2.8	Yes	Yes	No		Aspherical
21–35mm	f/3.5-4.2	No	Yes	No		
24–35mm	f/2	No	Yes	Yes	A	

==== Standard zooms ====
Focal length	Aperture	EX	full-frame	OS	HSM	Series	Note
17-40mm	f/1.8	No	No	No	No	A	
17–50mm (2010)	f/2.8	Yes	No	Yes	Yes		
17–70mm	f/2.8–4.5	No	No	No	Yes		MACRO
17–70mm	f/2.8-4.0	No	No	Yes	Yes		MACRO
17–70mm	f/2.8-4.0	No	No	Yes	Yes	C	MACRO
18–35mm	f/1.8	No	No	No	Yes	A	
18–50mm	f/2.8	Yes	No	No	No		
18–50mm	f/2.8	No	No	No	No	C	DN
18–50mm (2006)	f/2.8	Yes	No	No	No		MACRO
18–50mm	f/2.8-4.5	No	No	Yes	Yes		
18–50mm	f/3.5–5.6	No	No	No	No		
18-200mm	f/3.5-6.3	No	No	Yes	Yes	C	MACRO
24–60mm	f/2.8	Yes	Yes	No	No		
24–70mm	f/2.8	Yes	Yes	No	No		MACRO
24–70mm	f/2.8	Yes	Yes	No	Yes		
24–70mm	f/2.8	No	Yes	Yes	No	A	DN
24–70mm	f/2.8	No	Yes	Yes	Yes	A	
24–70mm	f/3.5–5.6	No	Yes	No	No		Aspherical HF
24–105mm	f/4	No	Yes	Yes	Yes	A	
24–135mm	f/2.8–4.5	No	Yes	No	No		Aspherical IF
28–70mm	f/2.8	No	Yes	No	No		
28–70mm	f/2.8	Yes	Yes	No	No		
28–70mm	f/2.8	Yes	Yes	No	No		DF
28–70mm	f/2.8	Yes	Yes	No	No		
28–70mm	f/2.8	No	Yes	No	No	C	DN
28–70mm	f/2.8–4	No	Yes	No	No		
28–70mm	f/2.8–4	No	Yes	No	No		UC
28–70mm	f/3.5–4.5	No	Yes	No	No		UC
28–80mm	f/3.5–5..6	No	Yes	No	No		Aspherical Macro
28–84mm	f/3.5–4.5	No	Yes	No	No		
28–85mm	f/3.5–4.5	No	Yes	No	No		
28–105mm	f/2.8–4	No	Yes	No	No		
28–105mm	f/3.8–5.6	No	Yes	No	No		Aspherical IF
28–105mm	f/4–5.6	No	Yes	No	No		UC
28–135mm	f/3.8–5.6	No	Yes	No	No		
28–135mm	f/4–5.6	No	Yes	No	No		
28–200mm	f/3.5–5.6	No	Yes	No	No		Macro
28–200mm	f/4–5.6	No	Yes	No	No		
28–300mm	f/3.5–6.3	No	Yes	No	No		Macro
28-300mm	f/3.5-6.3	No	Yes	No	No		DL Hyperzoom Aspherical IF
35–70mm	f/2.8–4	No	Yes	No	No		
35–70mm	f/3.5–4.5	No	Yes	No	No		
35–80mm	f/4–5.6	No	Yes	No	No		DL
35–105mm	f/3.5–4.5	No	Yes	No	No		Macro
35–135mm	f/3.5–4.5	No	Yes	No	No		
35–135mm	f/4–5.6	No	Yes	No	No		UC
35–200mm	f/4–5.6	No	Yes	No	No		
39–80mm	f/3.5	No	Yes	No	No		XQ
16-300mm	f/3.5-6.7	No	No	Yes	No	C	

==== Telephoto zooms ====
Focal length	Aperture	EX	full-frame	OS	HSM	Series	Introduction	Note
50-100mm	f/1.8	No	No	No	Yes	A	2016	
50-150mm	f/2.8	Yes	No	No	Yes			
50-150mm II	f/2.8	Yes	No	No	Yes			
50-150mm	f/2.8	Yes	No	Yes	Yes			APO
50–200mm	f/3.5-4.5	No	No	No	No			APO
50–500mm	f/4–6.3	Yes	Yes	No	Yes			
50–500mm	f/4.5-6.3	No	Yes	Yes	Yes			
55–200mm	f/4–5.6	No	No	No	No			
60–600mm	f/4.5–6.3	No	Yes	Yes	Yes	S		
70–150mm	f/3.5	No	No	No	No			
70–200mm	f/2.8	Yes	Yes	No	Yes		2006	MACRO
70–200mm	f/2.8	Yes	Yes	No	Yes		2005	
70–200mm 4/3	f/2.8	Yes	No	No	Yes		2008	
70–200mm II	f/2.8	Yes	Yes	No	Yes		2007	MACRO
70–200mm	f/2.8	Yes	Yes	Yes	Yes		2010	APO
70-200mm	f/2.8	No	Yes	Yes	Yes	S	2018	
70-210mm	f/2.8	No	No	No	No			APO
70–210mm	f/3.5–4.5	No	No	No	No			APO
70–210mm	f/4-5.6	No	No	No	No			UC
70–210mm II	f/4-5.6	No	No	No	No			UC
70–210mm	f/4.5	No	No	No	No			UC
70–250mm	f/3.5-4.5	No	No	No	No			
70–300mm	f/4–5.6	No	Yes	No	No			MACRO
70–300mm	f/4–5.6	No	Yes	No	No			APO
75–200mm	f/2.8-3.5	No	No	No	No			
75–200mm	f/3.8	No	No	No	No			
75–230mm	f/4.5	No	No	No	No			
75–250mm	f/4.5	No	No	No	No			
75–300mm	f/4.5–5.6	No	No	No	No			APO
80–200mm	f/3.5	No	No	No	No			
80–200mm	f/3.5-4.0	No	No	No	No			
80–200mm	f/4.5–5.6	No	No	No	No			
80–400mm	f/4.5–5.6	Yes	No	Yes	No			
100–200mm	f/4.5	No	No	No	No			
100–300mm	f/4	Yes	Yes	No	Yes			
100–300mm	f/4.5–6.7	No	No	No	No			DL
100-400mm	f/5-6.3	No	Yes	Yes	No	C	2020	DN
100-400mm	f/5-6.3	No	Yes	Yes	Yes	C	2017	
100–500mm	f/5.6–8	No	No	No	No			APO Zoom Tau
120–300mm	f/2.8	Yes	No	No	Yes			
120–300mm	f/2.8	Yes	Yes	No	Yes			
120-300mm	f/2.8	Yes	Yes	Yes	Yes			
120–300mm	f/2.8	No	Yes	Yes	Yes	S		
120–300mm	f/5.6	No	No	No	No			
120–300mm	f/5.6-6.3	No	No	No	No			
120–400mm	f/4.5–5.6	No	Yes	Yes	Yes			APO
135–400mm	f/4.5–5.6	No	Yes	No	No			
150–500mm	f/5–6.3	No	Yes	Yes	Yes			APO
150–600mm	f/5–6.3	No	Yes	Yes	Yes	C		
150–600mm	f/5–6.3	No	Yes	Yes	Yes	S		
170–500mm	f/5–6.3	No	Yes	No	No			
200–500mm	f/2.8	Yes	Yes	No	No			2x teleconverter included, allowing 400–1000mm f/5.6
300–800mm	f/5.6	Yes	Yes	No	Yes			APO
350-1200mm	f/11	No	No	No	No			APO
300-600mm	f/4	No	Yes	Yes	No	S	2025	

=== Prime lenses ===
==== Wide-angle primes ====
Focal length	Aperture	EX	full-frame	HSM	Series	Note
8mm	f/3.5	Yes	Yes	No		Circular Fisheye
8mm	f/4	Yes	Yes	No		Circular Fisheye
10mm	f/2.8	Yes	No	Yes		Fisheye Ultra-Wideangle
12mm	f/2.8	No	No	No		Fisheye Ultra-Wideangle
14mm	f/1.8	No	Yes	Yes	A	
14mm	f/2.8	Yes	No	Yes		Aspherical
14mm	f/3.5	No	No	No		
15mm	f/2.8	Yes	Yes	No		Diagonal Fisheye
16mm	f/1.4	No	No	No	C	DN
16mm	f/2.8	No	No	No		XQ Filtermatic Diagonal Fisheye
18mm	f/2.8	No	No	No		Filtermatic
18mm	f/3.2	No	No	No		XQ
18mm	f/3.5	No	No	No		XQ
20mm	f/1.4	No	Yes	No	A	DN
20mm	f/1.4	No	Yes	Yes	A	
20mm	f/1.8	Yes	No	Yes		Aspherical RF
20mm	f/2	No	Yes	No	C	DN
24mm	f/1.4	No	Yes	No	A	DN
24mm	f/1.4	No	Yes	Yes	A	
24mm	f/1.8	No	No	No		Aspherical
24mm	f/1.8	Yes	Yes	No		Aspherical Macro
24mm	f/2	No	Yes	No	C	DN
24mm	f/2.8	No	No	No		XQ Filtermatic
24mm	f/2.8	No	No	No		Aspherical
24mm	f/2.8	No	No	No		Super Wide
24mm II	f/2.8	No	No	No		Super Wide
24mm	f/3.5	No	Yes	No	C	DN
28mm	f/1.4	No	Yes	Yes	A	
28mm	f/1.8	Yes	Yes	No		Aspherical Macro
28mm	f/2.8	No	No	No		XQ Filtermatic
28mm	f/2.8	No	No	No		Mini Wide II
30mm	f/1.4	No	No	No	C	DN
35mm	f/1.2	No	Yes	No	A	DN
35mm	f/1.4	No	Yes	No	A	DN
35mm	f/1.4	No	Yes	Yes	A	
35mm	f/2.8	No	No	No		GN (guide number)

==== Standard primes ====
Focal length	Aperture	EX	full-frame	HSM	Series	Note
30mm	f/1.4	Yes	No	Yes		45mm equivalent on most APS-C systems, 48mm equivalent on Canon APS-C, 51mm on Sigma, 60mm on Four Thirds
30mm	f/1.4	No	No	No	C	DN
30mm	f/1.4	No	No	Yes	A	available for Canon, Nikon, and Sigma mounts
35mm	f/2	No	Yes	No	C	DN
40mm	f/1.4	Yes	Yes	Yes	A	
45mm	f/2.8	No	Yes	No	C	DN
50mm	f/1.4	Yes	Yes	Yes		
50mm	f/1.4	No	Yes	Yes	A	
65mm	f/2	No	Yes	No	C	DN

==== Macro primes ====
Focal length	Aperture	EX	full-frame	OS	HSM	Note
Macro 50mm	f/2.8	Yes	No	No	No	
Macro 50mm	f/2.8	Yes	Yes	No	No	
Macro 55mm	f/2.8	No	No	No	No	XQ
Macro 70mm	f/2.8	Yes	Yes	No	No	
Macro 90mm	f/2.8	No	No	No	No	
Macro 100mm	f/2.8	No	No	No	No	XQ
Macro 105mm	f/2.8	Yes	No	No	No	
Macro 105mm	f/2.8	Yes	Yes	No	No	
Macro 105mm	f/2.8	Yes	Yes	Yes	Yes	
APO Macro 150mm	f/2.8	Yes	Yes	No	Yes	
APO Macro 105mm	f/2.8	Yes	Yes	Yes	Yes	
APO Macro 180mm	f/2.8	No	No	No	No	
APO Macro 180mm	f/2.8	Yes	Yes	Yes	Yes	
APO Macro 180mm	f/2.8	Yes	Yes	No	Yes	IF
APO Macro 180mm	f/5.6	No	No	No	No	

==== Telephoto primes ====
Focal length	Aperture	EX	full-frame	OS	HSM	Series	Note
56mm	f/1.4	No	No	No	No	C	DN
85mm	f/1.4	Yes	Yes	No	Yes		
85mm	f/1.4	No	Yes	No	No	A	DN
85mm	f/1.4	No	Yes	No	Yes	A	
90mm	f/2.8	No	Yes	No	No	C	DN
105mm	f/1.4	No	Yes	No	No		
105mm	f/2.8	No	Yes	No	No	A	DN MARCO
105mm	f/1.4	No	Yes	No	Yes	A	
135mm	f/1.8	No	Yes	No	Yes	A	
135mm	f/1.8	No	No	No	No		XQ
135mm	f/1.8	No	No	No	No		Sigmatel
135mm	f/2.5	No	No	No	No		T-mount
135mm	f/2.8	No	No	No	No		
135mm	f/3.5	No	No	No	No		
200mm	f/2.8	No	No	No	No		XQ
200mm	f/3.5	No	No	No	No		
200mm	f/4	No	No	No	No		
APO 300mm	f/2.8	Yes	Yes	No	Yes		
APO 300mm	f/2.8	No	No	No	No		
300mm	f/4	No	No	No	No		XQ
APO 300mm	f/4	No	No	No	No		MACRO
APO 300mm	f/4	No	No	No	Yes		MACRO
APO 300mm	f/4.5	No	No	No	No		
300mm	f/5.6	No	No	No	No		
400mm	f/5.6	No	No	No	No		
400mm	f/5.6	No	No	No	No		Mirror
APO 400mm	f/5.6	No	No	No	No		
APO 400mm	f/5.6	No	No	No	No		MACRO
APO 400mm	f/5.6	No	No	No	Yes		MACRO
500mm	f/4	No	No	No	No		Mirror-Ultratelephoto
APO 500mm	f/4.5	No	No	No	No		
APO 500mm	f/4.5	Yes	Yes	No	Yes		
500mm	f/4	No	Yes	Yes	Yes	S	
APO 500mm	f/7.2	No	No	No	No		
500mm	f/8	No	No	No	No		Mirror
600mm	f/8	No	No	No	No		Mirror
APO 800mm	f/5.6	Yes	Yes	No	Yes		
APO 1000mm	f/8	No	No	No	No		
1000mm	f/13.5	No	No	No	No		Mirror

=== DC lenses for APS-C ===
- 4.5mm f/2.8 EX DC Circular Fisheye HSM
- 8–16mm f/4.5-5.6 DC HSM
- 10mm f/2.8 EX DC Fisheye HSM
- 30mm f/1.4 EX DC HSM
- 10–20mm f/3.5 EX DC HSM
- 10–20mm f/4–5.6 EX DC HSM
- 17–50mm f/2.8 EX DC OS HSM
- 17–70mm f/2.8–4.5 DC MACRO HSM
- 17–70mm f/2.8-4.0 DC OS MACRO HSM
- 17–70mm f/2.8-4.0 DC OS MACRO HSM 'C'
- 18–35mm f/1.8 DC HSM A
- 18–50mm f/2.8 EX DC
- 18–50mm f/2.8 EX DC MACRO
- 18–50mm f/2.8-4.5 DC OS HSM
- 18–50mm f/3.5–5.6 DC
- 18–125mm f/3.5–5.6 DC
- 18–125mm f/3.8–5.6 DC OS HSM
- 18–200mm f/3.5–6.3 DC
- 18–200mm f/3.5–6.3 DC OS (HSM Version for Nikon only)
- 18–200mm f/3.5-6.3 DC OS HSM II
- 18–200mm f/3.5-6.3 DC Macro OS HSM C
- 18–250mm f/3.5–6.3 DC OS HSM
- 50-100mm f/1.8 DC HSM
- 50–150mm f/2.8 EX DC HSM
- 50–150mm f/2.8 EX DC HSM II
- 50–150mm f/2.8 EX DC OS HSM
- 55–200mm f/4–5.6 DC

=== DN lenses for mirrorless cameras ===
- 56mm f/1.4 DC DN C
- 16mm f/1.4 DC DN Contemporary
- 10–18mm f/2.8 DC DN C
- 19mm f/2.8 EX DN
- 19mm f/2.8 DN A
- 30mm f/1.4 DC DN C
- 30mm f/2.8 EX DN
- 30mm f/2.8 DN A
- 60mm f/2.8 DN A

== Lawsuit ==
In 2011, Nikon filed a suit against Sigma, alleging it had violated patents relating to Nikon's "Vibration Reduction" image stabilisation technology. In 2015, the suit ended through settlement, with no details disclosed.

== See also ==
- List of digital camera brands
- Hyper Sonic Motor (HSM)
- List of Sigma lenses with Nikon F-mount and integrated autofocus motor
- Third-party lenses for Sony E-mount system

Type	Lens	2002	2003	2004	2005	2006	2007	2008	2009	2010	2011	2012	2013	2014	2015	2016	2017	2018	2019	2020	2021	2022	2023	2024	2025
MILC	Full frame																								
MILC	Full frame																	BF							
MILC	Full frame																	fp L							
MILC	Full frame																	fp							
MILC	APS-H															SD Quattro H									
MILC	APS-C															SD Quattro									
Compact (Prime lens)	Wide														dp0 Quattro										
Compact (Prime lens)	Wide							DP1		DP1s	DP1x		DP1 Merrill		dp1 Quattro										
Compact (Prime lens)	Normal								DP2	DP2s	DP2x		DP2 Merrill	dp2 Quattro											
Compact (Prime lens)	Tele												DP3 Merrill	dp3 Quattro											
DSLR	APS-C	SD9		SD10				SD14		SD15		SD1	SD1 Merrill												
