= Sigma 8mm f/3.5 EX DG lens =

Sigma 8mm f/3.5 EX DG circular fisheye
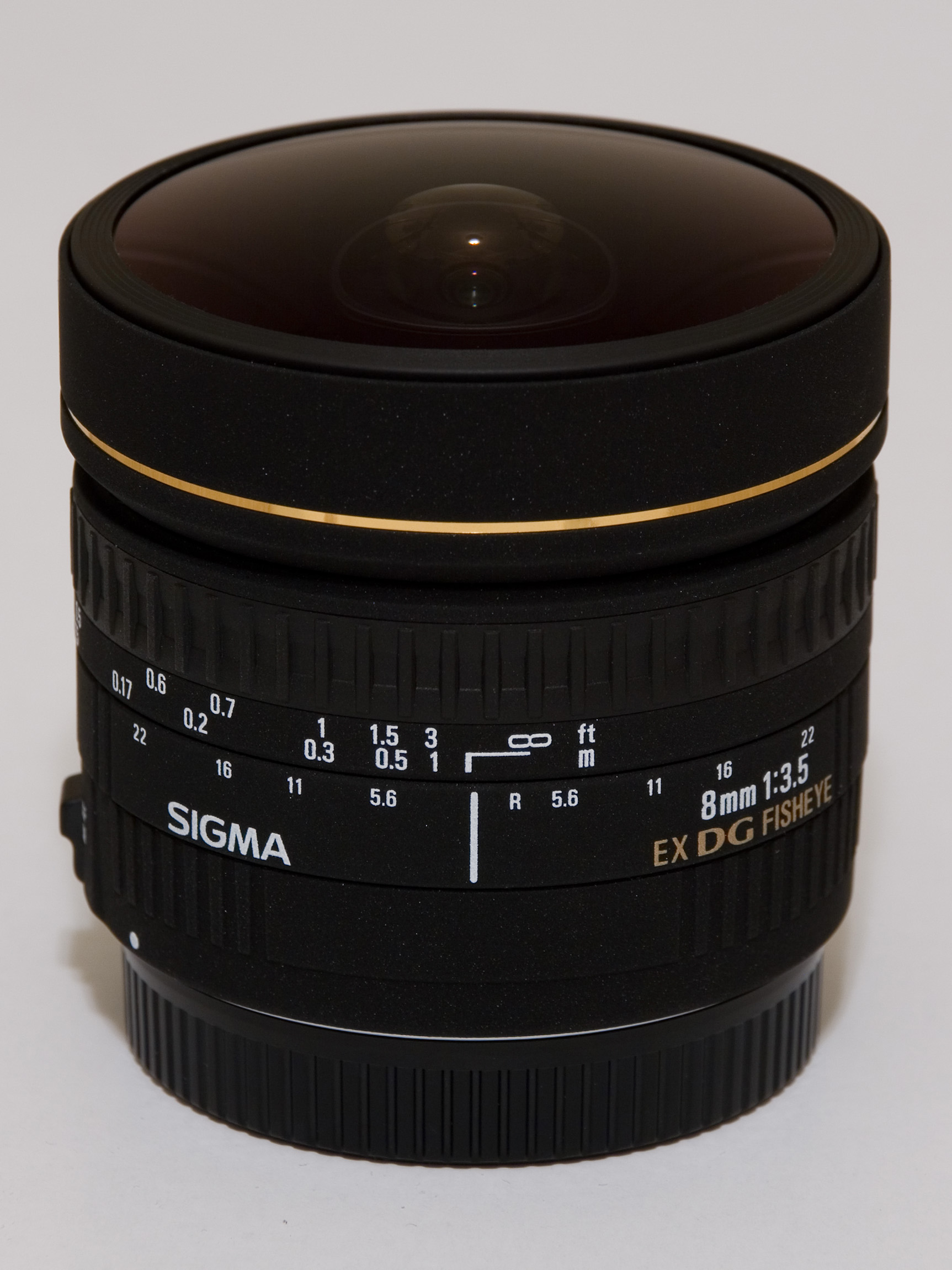
- Maker: Sigma Corporation

Technical data
- Type: circular fisheye lens
- Focal length: 8mm
- Crop factor: 180 degrees
- Aperture (max/min): f/3.5
- Close focus distance: 13.5cm
- Max. magnification: 1:4.6
- Diaphragm blades: 6
- Construction: 11 elements in 6 groups

Features
- Short back focus: No No
- Ultrasonic motor: No No
- Lens-based stabilization: No No
- Macro capable: No No
- Unique features: circular fisheye

Physical
- Max. length: 68.6mm
- Diameter: 73.5mm
- Weight: 400g (14.0oz)
- Filter diameter: rear (Gelatin filter)

Accessories
- Lens hood: none

Angle of view
- Horizontal: 180
- Vertical: 180
- Diagonal: 180

Retail info
- MSRP: 1230 USD

The Sigma 8mm f/3.5 EX DG is a photographic lens introduced on 9 August 2006. It is a circular fisheye lens, designed to project a 180-degree field of view in all directions onto a circular image when used on a full-frame camera. The lens is available in Canon, Nikon, and Sigma mounts.
