= Sigma 18-35mm f/1.8 DC HSM A =

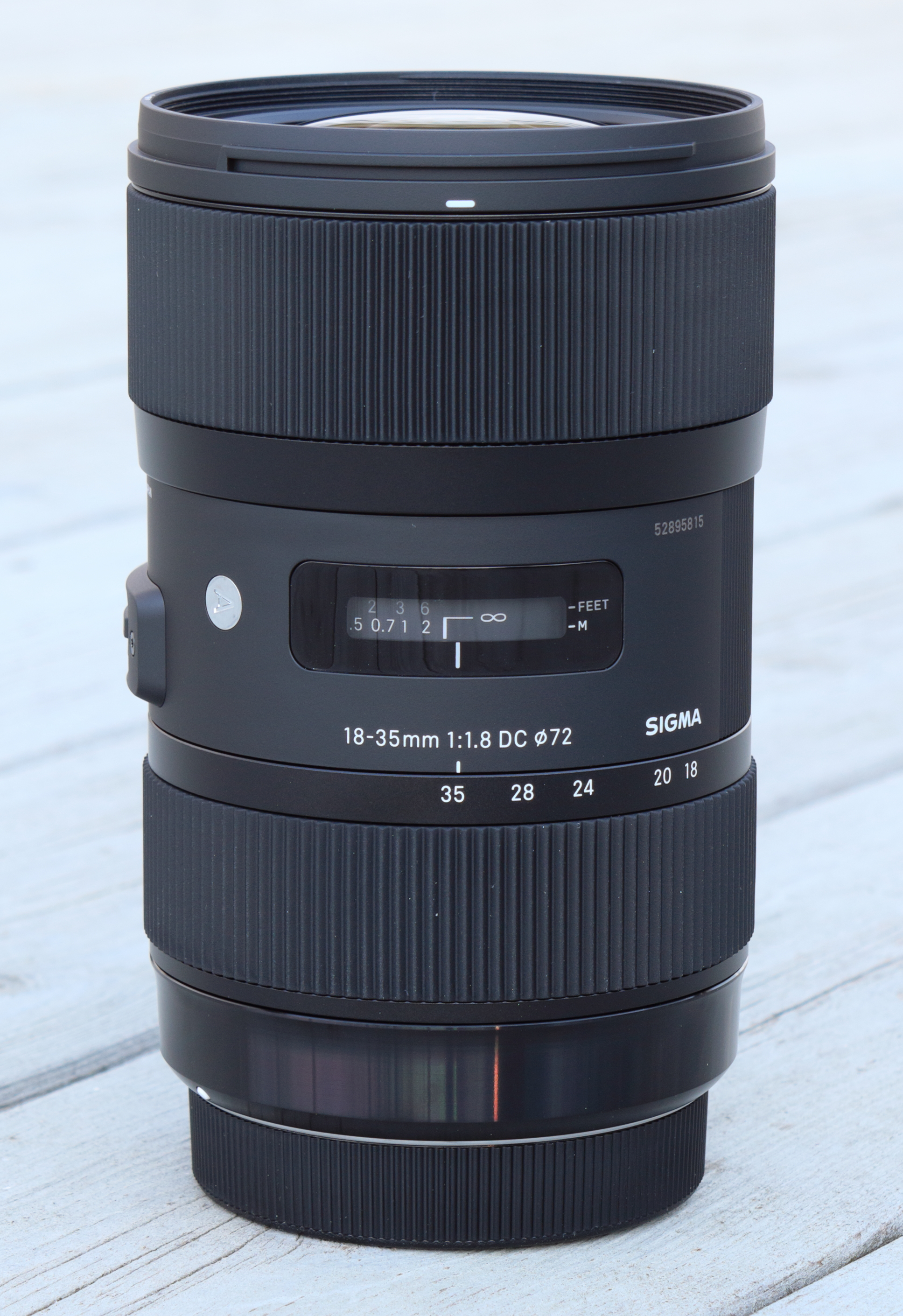
- Maker: Sigma Corporation

Technical data
- Type: Zoom
- Focus drive: Hypersonic motor
- Focal length: 18-35mm
- Focal length (35mm equiv.): 27-52.5mm
- Aperture (max/min): f/1.8 - f/16
- Close focus distance: 0.28 metres (0.92 ft)
- Max. magnification: 0.23
- Diaphragm blades: 9, rounded
- Construction: 17 elements in 12 groups

Features
- Lens-based stabilization: No No
- Unique features: Art series; 5 SLD glass elements, 4 glassmold aspherical elements, wide aperture
- Application: Standard zoom

Physical
- Max. length: 121 millimetres (4.8 in)
- Diameter: 78 millimetres (3.1 in)
- Weight: 810 grams (1.79 lb)
- Filter diameter: 72mm

Accessories
- Lens hood: LH780-03

History
- Introduction: 2013

The Sigma 18-35mm f/1.8 DC HSM Art lens is a fast, constant-aperture wide standard zoom lens made by Sigma Corporation. It was announced April 18, 2013.

This lens, at its time of manufacturing, was the only standard zoom with a constant f/1.8 aperture. The lens was designed specifically for crop body DSLRs enabling a crop factor adjusted (full frame equivalent) of f/2.88 for Canon or f/2.7 for Nikon crop body DSLRs across an equivalent range of 28mm-56mm (Canon full frame adjusted) or 27mm-53mm (Nikon full frame adjusted).

In the year of its introduction, the lens won an EXC!TE award and was named Lens of the Year at the Camera Grand Prix.
