= Sigma 24-35mm F2 DG HSM Art =

- Maker: Sigma
- Lens mount(s): Canon EF, Nikon F (FX), Sigma SA Bayonet

Technical data
- Type: Zoom
- Focus drive: Ring-type ultrasonic
- Focal length: 24-35mm
- Aperture (max/min): f/2.0
- Close focus distance: 0.28 metres (0.92 ft)
- Max. magnification: 0.23
- Diaphragm blades: 9
- Construction: 18 elements in 13 groups

Features
- Manual focus override: Yes Yes
- Weather-sealing: No No
- Lens-based stabilization: No No
- Aperture ring: No No

Physical
- Diameter: 88 millimetres (3.5 in)
- Weight: 940 grams (2.07 lb)
- Filter diameter: 82mm

Accessories
- Lens hood: LH876-03

History
- Introduction: 2015

The Sigma 24-35mm F2 DG HSM Art is an interchangeable camera lens announced by Sigma Corporation on June 19, 2015.
