= Sigma 18–50mm f/2.8 EX DC Macro lens =

Zoom lens for photographic camera

18-50mm f/2.8 EX DC Macro
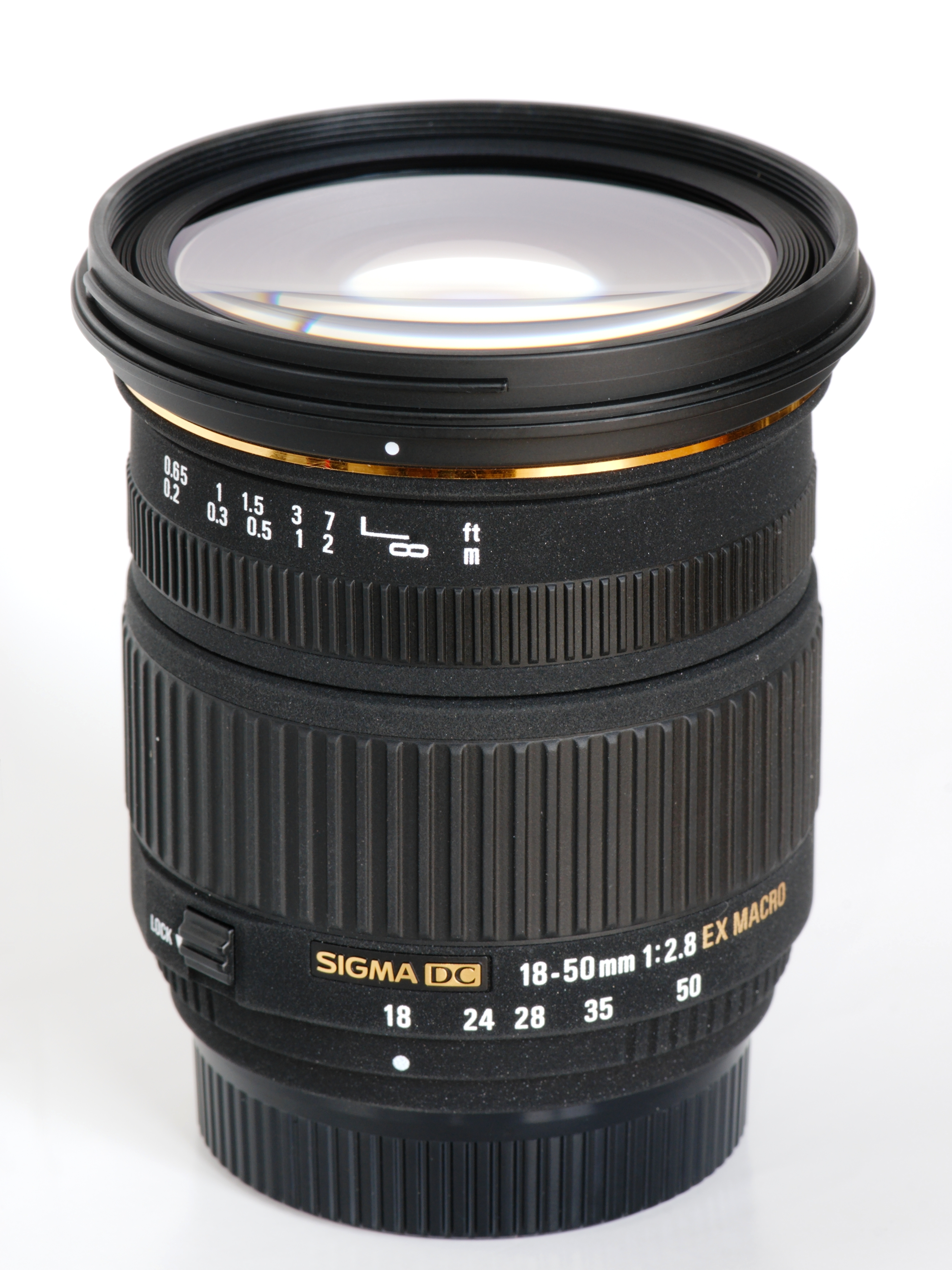
- Maker: Sigma Corporation

Technical data
- Focal length: 18-50mm
- Aperture (max/min): f/2.8 – f/22
- Close focus distance: 28cm/11 in.
- Max. magnification: 1:3
- Diaphragm blades: 7
- Construction: 15 elements in 13 groups

Features
- Short back focus: No No
- Lens-based stabilization: No No
- Macro capable: Yes Yes
- Application: portrait

Physical
- Max. length: 85.8mm/3.4 in.
- Diameter: 79mm/3.1 in.
- Weight: 450g/15.9 oz.
- Filter diameter: 72 mm

Accessories
- Lens hood: Petal

Angle of view
- Diagonal: 69.3°–27.9°

History
- Introduction: 2006

Retail info
- MSRP: 700.00 USD

The Sigma 18-50mm f/2.8 EX DC Macro is a wide to normal angle, zoom lens made by the Sigma Corporation.

The lens is produced in Canon EF mount, Four Thirds System, Nikon F-mount, Pentax K mount, the SA mount, and the Sony/Minolta AF Mount varieties, all have the same optical formula.

The lens is designed for digital crop DSLR with an APS-C sized sensor. Because of this, if the lens is used on a non-crop body, such as a Nikon D700, it will cause significant mechanical vignetting. When used on a body with a field of view compensation factor of 2× (Four Thirds body) it provides a field of view equivalent to a 36–100mm lens mounted in a 35mm body. In a 1.6× body, such as the Canon EOS 450D, it provides a less narrow field of view, equivalent to a 29–80mm lens mounted on a 35mm frame body. With a 1.5× body such as the Nikon D300, it provides a less narrow field of view, equivalent to a 27–75mm lens mounted on a 35mm frame body.

== Technical information ==
The 18–50mm f/2.8 EX DC Macro is a consumer-level lens. It is constructed with a plastic body and a metal mount. The lens features a distance window with depth of field scale. A 7-blade, maximum aperture of f/2.8 gives the lens the ability to create depth of field effects. The optical construction of the lens contains 15 lens elements, including two aspherical lens elements, one SLD (Special Low Dispersion) element, and one ELD (Extraordinary Low Dispersion) element. The lens uses an internal focusing system, powered by a micro motor. Auto focus speed of this lens is moderate, but because of its focal length, auto focus time is not long. The front of the lens does not rotate, but the focusing ring does, when using auto focus. The lens uses an extending inner lens barrel when zooming; this allows a more compact design, and does not rotate while zooming.

=== HSM variant ===
In 2007, Sigma released a HSM version of the 18–50mm f/2.8 EX DC Macro, called the 18–50mm f/2.8 EX DC Macro HSM. This lens is available for Nikon F-mount only. The lens has the same optical formula as the non-HSM lens, but is 0.5 mm shorter, and 85 g (18.9 oz.) heavier. The lens has a closer minimum focus distance of 20 cm, but because of the larger Nikon DX sensor size, the magnification rating is still 1:3. Also because of larger sensor size, the stated angle of view is 76.5°–31.7°, though these angles are still obtainable on the non-HSM version.

== See also ==
- List of Nikon compatible lenses with integrated autofocus-motor

| Kind | Type | Focal length | Aperture | 2000s | | | | | | | 2010s | | | | | | | |
| Kind | Type | Focal length | Aperture | 03 | 04 | 05 | 06 | 07 | 08 | 09 | 10 | 11 | 12 | 13 | 14 | 15 | 16 | 17 |
| Prime | Fish-eye | 8 | 3.5 | | | | Olympus Zuiko Digital 8mm F3.5 | | | | | | | | | | | |
| Prime | Norm. | 24 | 1.8 | | | | Sigma 24mm F1.8 EX DG | | | | | | | | | | | |
| Prime | Norm. | 25 | 1.4 | | | | | Leica D Summilux 25mm F1.4 ASPH | | | | | | | | | | |
| Prime | Norm. | 25 | 2.8 | | | | | | Olympus Zuiko Digital 25mm F2.8 | | | | | | | | | |
| Prime | Norm. | 30 | 1.4 | | | | Sigma 30mm F1.4 EX DC HSM | | | | | | | | | | | |
| Prime | Norm. | 35 | 3.5 | | | Olympus Zuiko Digital 35mm F3.5 Macro | | | | | | | | | | | | |
| Prime | Tele | 50 | 1.4 | | | | | | Sigma 50mm F1.4 EX DG HSM | | | | | | | | | |
| Prime | Tele | 50 | 2.0 | Olympus Zuiko Digital ED 50mm F2.0 Macro | | | | | | | | | | | | | | |
| Prime | Tele | 105 | 2.8 | | | | Sigma 105mm F2.8 EX DG Macro | | | | | | | | | | | |
| Prime | Tele | 150 | 2.0 | | | | | | | Olympus Zuiko Digital ED 150mm F2 | | | | | | | | |
| Prime | Tele | 150 | 2.8 | | | | Sigma 150mm F2.8 EX DG APO Macro HSM | | | | | | | | | | | |
| Prime | Super tele | 300 | 2.8 | | Olympus Zuiko Digital ED 300mm F2.8 | | | | | | | | | | | | | |
| Zoom | UWA | 7-14 | 4.0 | | | Olympus Zuiko Digital ED 7-14mm F4 | | | | | | | | | | | | |
| Zoom | UWA | 9-18 | 4–5.6 | | | | | | Olympus Zuiko Digital ED 9-18mm F4-5.6 | | | | | | | | | |
| Zoom | UWA | 10-20 | 4–5.6 | | | | | | Sigma 10-20mm F4.0-5.6 EX DC HSM | | | | | | | | | |
| Zoom | UWA | 11-22 | 2.8–3.5 | | Olympus Zuiko Digital 11-22mm F2.8-3.5 | | | | | | | | | | | | | |
| Zoom | Std. | 12-60 | 2.8–4 | | | | | | | Olympus Zuiko Digital ED 12-60mm F2.8-4 SWD | | | | | | | | |
| Zoom | Std. | 14-xx | 2.0 | | | Olympus Zuiko Digital ED 14-35mm f/2.0 SWD | | | | | | | | | | | | |
| Zoom | Std. | 14-xx | 2.8-3.5 | Olympus Zuiko Digital 14-54mm F2.8-3.5 | | | | | Olympus Zuiko Digital 14-54mm F2.8-3.5 II | | | | | | | | | |
| Zoom | Std. | 14-xx | 2.8-3.5 | | | | | | Leica D Vario-Elmarit 14-50mm F2.8-3.5 ASPH | | | | | | | | | |
| Zoom | Std. | 14-xx | 3.5-5.6 | | Olympus Zuiko Digital 14-45mm F3.5-5.6 | | | | | | | | | | | | | |
| Zoom | Std. | 14-xx | 3.5-5.6 | | | | | Leica D Vario-Elmar 14-150mm F3.5-5.6 ASPH | | | | | | | | | | |
| Zoom | Std. | 14-xx | 3.8-5.6 | | | | Leica D Vario-Elmar 14-50mm F3.8-5.6 ASPH | | | | | | | | | | | |
| Zoom | Std. | 17,5-45 | 3.5-5.6 | | | Olympus Zuiko Digital 17.5-45mm F3.5-5.6 | | | | | | | | | | | | |
| Zoom | Std. | 18-50 | 2.8 | | | | Sigma 18-50mm F2.8 EX DC | | | | | | | | | | | |
| Zoom | Std. | 18-50 | 3.5-5.6 | | Sigma 18-50mm F3.5-5.6 DC | | | | | | | | | | | | | |
| Zoom | Std. | 18-125 | 3.5-5.6 | | | | Sigma 18-125mm F3.5-5.6 DC | | | | | | | | | | | |
| Zoom | Std. | 18-180 | 3.5–6.3 | | | | Olympus Zuiko Digital ED 18-180mm F3.5-6.3 | | | | | | | | | | | |
| Zoom | Tele | 35-100 | 2.0 | | | Olympus Zuiko Digital ED 35-100mm F2 | | | | | | | | | | | | |
| Zoom | Tele | 50-500 | 4.0-6.3 | | | | | | | Sigma 50-500mm F4-6.3 EX DG HSM | | | | | | | | |
| Zoom | Tele | 5x-200 | 2.8-3.5 | Olympus Zuiko Digital ED 50-200mm f/2.8-3.5 | | | | Olympus Zuiko Digital ED 50-200mm F2.8-3.5 SWD | | | | | | | | | | |
| Zoom | Tele | 5x-200 | 4-5.6 | | | | | | Sigma 55-200mm F4-5.6 DC | | | | | | | | | |
| Zoom | Tele | 70-200 | 2.8 | | | | | | | Sigma 70-200mm F2.8 EX DG Macro II HSM | | | | | | | | |
| Zoom | Tele | 70-300 | 4-5.6 | | | | | Olympus Zuiko Digital ED 70-300mm F4-5.6 | | | | | | | | | | |
| Zoom | Tele | 40-150 | 3.5-4.5 | | Olympus Zuiko Digital 40-150mm F3.5-4.5 | | | | | | | | | | | | | |
| Zoom | Tele | 40-150 | 4-5.6 | | | | Olympus Zuiko Digital ED 40-150mm F4-5.6 | | | | | | | | | | | |
| Zoom | Super Tele | 90-250 | 2.8 | | | Olympus Zuiko Digital ED 90-250mm F2.8 | | | | | | | | | | | | |
| Zoom | Super Tele | 135-400 | 4.5-5.6 | | | | | Sigma 135-400mm F4.5-5.6 DG APO | | | | | | | | | | |
| Zoom | Super Tele | 300-800 | 5.6 | | | | | Sigma 300-800mm F5.6 EX DG HSM APO | | | | | | | | | | |
| Teleconverter | | | | | Olympus Zuiko Digital 1.4x Teleconverter EC-14 | | | | | | | | | | | | | |
| Teleconverter | | | | | Olympus Zuiko Digital 2x Teleconverter EC-20 | | | | | | | | | | | | | |
| Extension tube | | | | | Olympus Extension Tube EX-25 | | | | | | | | | | | | | |
| Kind | Type | Focal length | Aperture | 03 | 04 | 05 | 06 | 07 | 08 | 09 | 10 | 11 | 12 | 13 | 14 | 15 | 16 | 17 |
| Kind | Type | Focal length | Aperture | 2000s | | | | | | | 2010s | | | | | | | |
