= Sigma 120-400mm f/4.5-5.6 DG OS HSM lens =

Sigma lens

APO 120-400mm F4.5-5.6 DG OS HSM
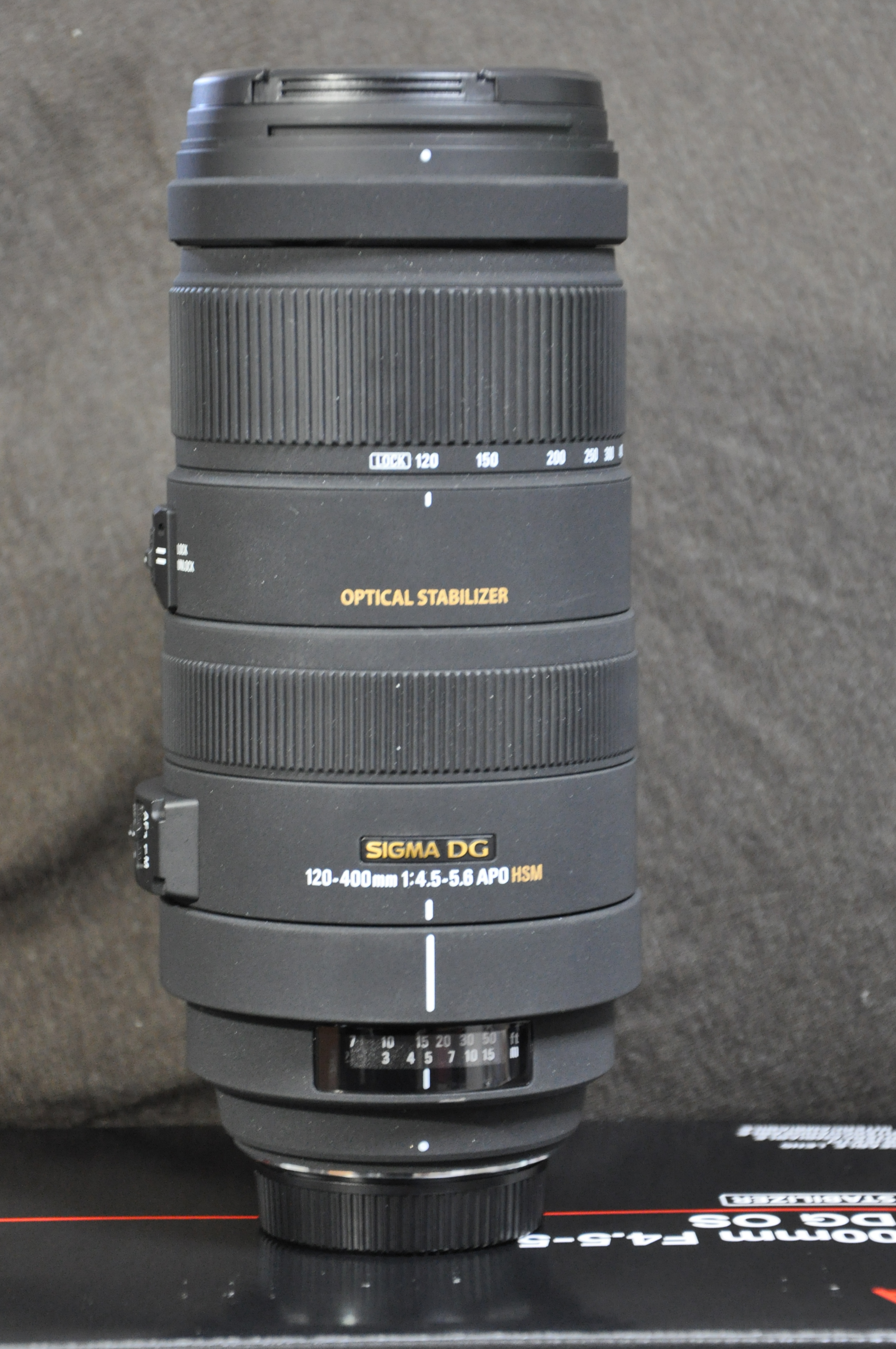
- Maker: Sigma

Technical data
- Type: Telephoto zoom
- Focus drive: Ultrasonic motor
- Focal length: 120-400mm
- Crop factor: 1.0
- Aperture (max/min): f/4.5-5.6-f/22
- Close focus distance: 150cm
- Max. magnification: 1:4.2
- Diaphragm blades: 9
- Construction: 21 elements in 15 groups

Features
- Short back focus: No No
- Lens-based stabilization: Yes Yes
- Macro capable: No No

Physical
- Max. length: 203.5mm
- Diameter: 92.5mm
- Weight: 1640g
- Filter diameter: 77mm

Retail info
- MSRP: 852.33 USD

The Sigma APO 120-400mm F4.5-5.6 DG OS HSM lens is a super-telephoto lens produced by Sigma Corporation. It contains three SLD (Special Low Dispersion) glass elements to provide correction for chromatic aberration. It is aimed toward advanced consumers.

== See also ==
- List of Nikon compatible lenses with integrated autofocus-motor
