= Sigma 20mm F1.4 DG HSM Art =

- Maker: Sigma
- Lens mount(s): Canon EF, Nikon F (FX), Sigma SA, Sony E

Technical data
- Type: Prime
- Focus drive: Ring-type ultrasonic
- Close focus distance: 0.30 metres (0.98 ft)
- Max. magnification: 0.14
- Diaphragm blades: 9
- Construction: 15 elements in 11 groups

Features
- Manual focus override: Yes Yes
- Weather-sealing: No No
- Lens-based stabilization: No No
- Aperture ring: No No

Physical
- Max. length: 130 millimetres (5.1 in)
- Diameter: 91 millimetres (3.6 in)
- Weight: 950 grams (2.09 lb)

History
- Introduction: 2015

The Sigma 20mm F1.4 DG HSM Art is an interchangeable wide angle lens announced by Sigma Corporation on October 16, 2015.

Much like the similar 24mm F1.4, it is designed for wide angle photography with shallow depth of field. At full aperture, it has similar focus depth to a 35mm at f/2.8.
