= Sony E 55-210mm F4.5-6.3 OSS =

2011 telephoto zoom lens

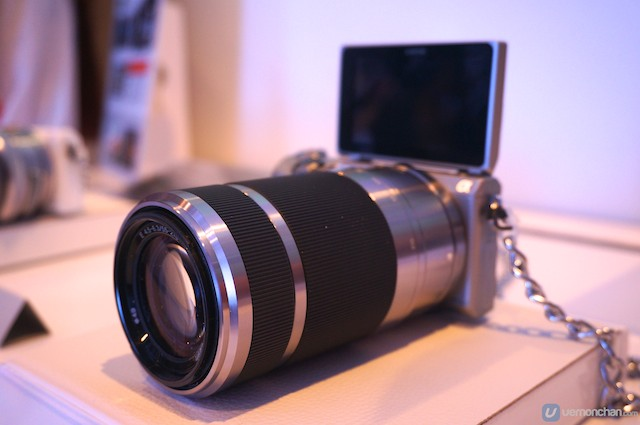
- Sony 55-210mm lens on a Sony NEX-5T
- Maker: Sony
- Lens mount(s): Sony E-mount

Technical data
- Type: Zoom
- Focus drive: Autofocus
- Focal length: 55-210mm
- Focal length (35mm equiv.): 82.5-315mm
- Image format: APS-C
- Aperture (max/min): f/4.5-6.3
- Close focus distance: 1.0 metre (3.3 ft)
- Max. magnification: 0.215x
- Diaphragm blades: 7
- Construction: 13 elements in 9 groups

Features
- Manual focus override: Yes Yes
- Weather-sealing: No No
- Lens-based stabilization: Yes Yes
- Aperture ring: No No
- Application: Landscape, Travel zoom

Physical
- Diameter: 63.8 millimetres (2.51 in)
- Weight: 343 grams (0.756 lb)
- Filter diameter: 49mm

Accessories
- Lens hood: Barrel-type lens hood

History
- Introduction: 2011

Retail info
- MSRP: $348 USD

The Sony E 55-210mm F4.5-6.3 OSS is a variable maximum aperture telephoto zoom lens for the Sony E-mount, released by Sony on August 24, 2011. The lens is sometimes bundled with various Sony Alpha mirrorless cameras along with the Sony 16-50mm kit lens.

== Build quality ==
The lens showcases a glossy black (or silver) plastic exterior with a pair of rubber focus and zoom rings. The barrel of the lens telescopes outward from the main lens body as it's zoomed in from 55mm to 210mm. However, the lens does not come with a zoom lock to help in combatting zoom creep.

== Image quality ==
The lens tends to be slightly soft throughout its zoom range, with minimal pin-cushion distortion, vignetting, and chromatic aberration.

== See also ==
- List of Sony E-mount lenses
