= Sony FE 16-35mm F2.8 GM II =

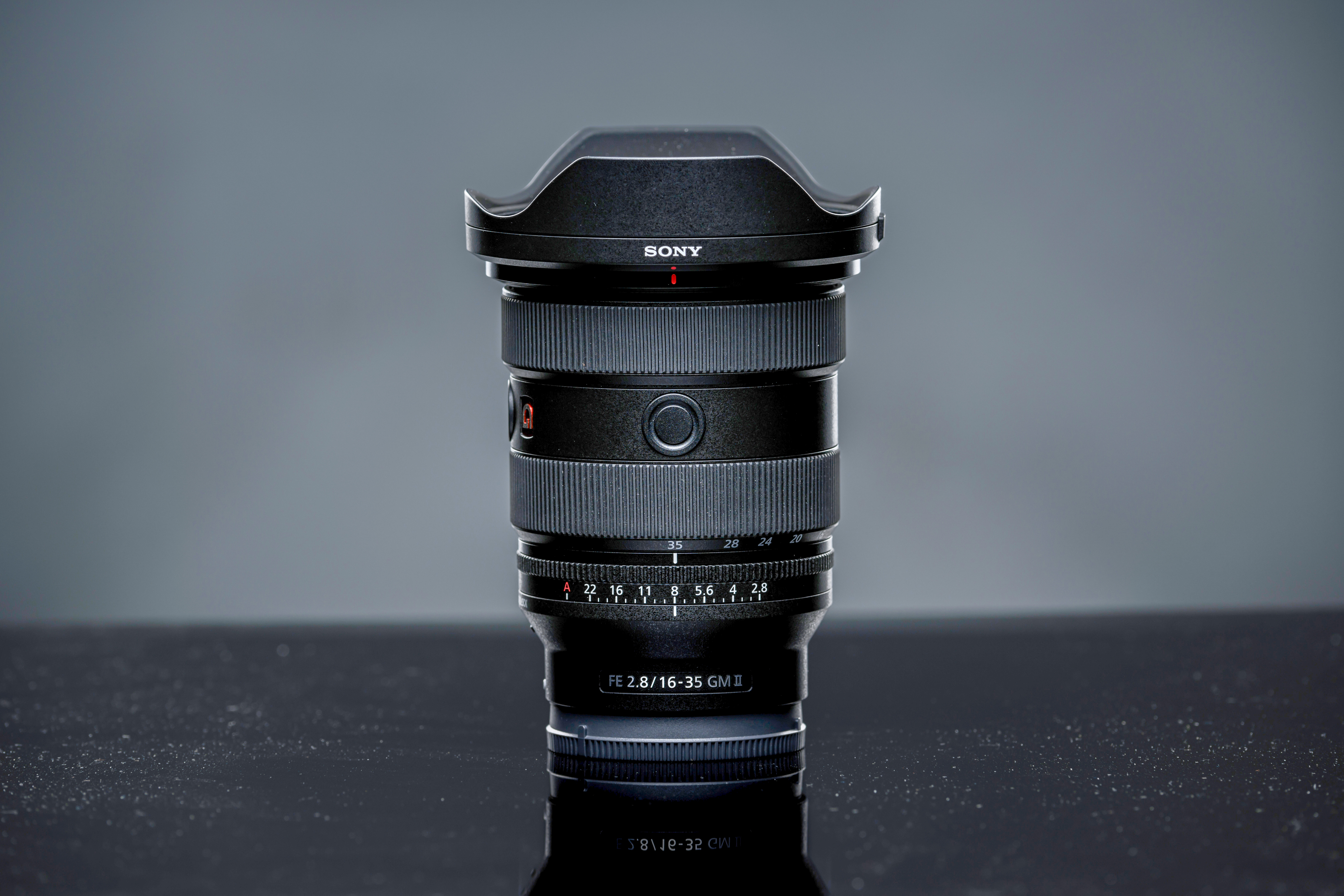
- Maker: Sony
- Lens mount: Sony E-mount

Technical data
- Type: Zoom
- Focal length: 16-35mm
- Image format: 35mm full-frame
- Aperture (max/min): f/2.8-22
- Close focus distance: 0.22 metres (0.72 ft)
- Max. magnification: 0.32x
- Diaphragm blades: 11
- Construction: 15 elements in 12 groups

Features
- Unique features: GM-series lens
- Application: Landscape, Architectural

Physical
- Max. length: 111.5 millimetres (4.39 in)
- Diameter: 87.8 millimetres (3.46 in)
- Weight: 547 grams (1.206 lb)
- Filter diameter: 82

History
- Introduction: 2023

Retail info
- MSRP: $2650 USD

The Sony FE 16-35mm F2.8 GM II is a premium constant maximum aperture wide-angle full-frame (FE) zoom lens for the Sony E-mount, announced by Sony on August 29, 2023. The field of view ranges from 107° to 63° in full-frame format.

The lens is the successor of the Sony FE 16-35mm F2.8 GM, which was released in 2017.

== Build quality and improvements compared to the predecessor ==
One of the main properties of the lens are the lens glasses. The lens has a total of 15 elements, including aspherical, (Super) ED, and XA lenses. These ensure high image sharpness at the corners of the image while reducing chromatic aberrations (ED). The border sharpness increased visibly compared to the 2017 model, reaching between 20 and 30% quality loss between image center and border. The sweet spot for continuous image quality across the photo is measured at f/5.6. Plastic is the main compound of the housing of the lens. Compared to its predecessor, the mass was reduced from 680g to 548g and the length from 122mm to 112mm. The image quality is described as outstanding, and the lens shows significant improvements over its predecessor. One of the few negative aspects is the missing optical stabilisator. Depending on the situation, onion rings in bokeh highlights may appear.

== Equipment ==
The lens (SEL1635GM2.SYX) is offered with a tulip-shaped plastic hood (ALC-SH177; 21 grams), lens front cap (ALC-F82S), lens rear cap (ALC-R1EM), a soft case and a case strap.

== See also ==
- List of Sony E-mount lenses
- Sony FE 16-35mm F4 ZA OSS
- Sony FE 16-35mm F2.8 GM
