= Sony Zeiss Distagon T* FE 35mm F1.4 ZA =

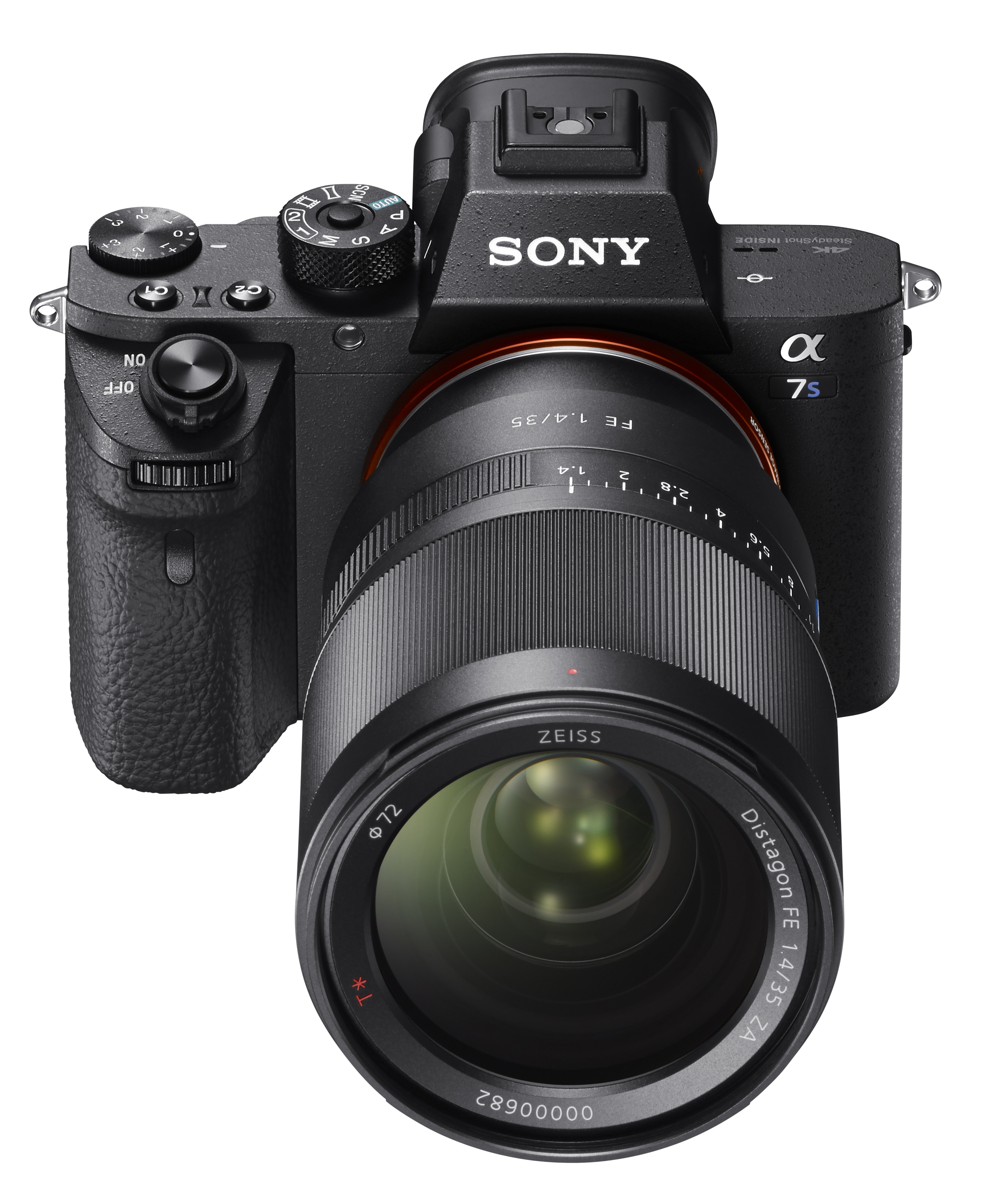
- The Sony Zeiss Distagon T* FE 35mm F1.4 ZA mounted on a Sony α7S II camera
- Maker: Sony
- Lens mount: Sony E-mount

Technical data
- Type: Prime
- Focus drive: Piezoelectric
- Focal length: 35mm
- Image format: 35mm full-frame
- Aperture (max/min): f/1.4
- Close focus distance: 0.30 metres (0.98 ft)
- Max. magnification: 0.18
- Diaphragm blades: 9
- Construction: 12 elements in 8 groups

Features
- Manual focus override: Yes Yes
- Weather-sealing: Yes Yes
- Lens-based stabilization: No No
- Aperture ring: Yes Yes
- Unique features: Carl Zeiss approved
- Application: Landscape, Portrait, Low-light

Physical
- Max. length: 112 millimetres (4.4 in)
- Diameter: 79 millimetres (3.1 in)
- Weight: 630 grams (1.39 lb)
- Filter diameter: 72mm

Accessories
- Lens hood: ALC-SH137

History
- Introduction: 2015

Retail info
- MSRP: $1499 USD

The Sony Zeiss Distagon T* FE 35mm F1.4 ZA is a large-aperture, wide-angle full-frame prime lens for the Sony E-mount. It was announced by Sony on March 4, 2015.

Though designed for Sony's full frame E-mount cameras, the lens can be used on Sony's APS-C E-mount camera bodies, with an equivalent full-frame field-of-view of 52.5mm.

== Build quality ==
The lens features a weather resistant metal exterior with a dedicated aperture ring, focusing ring, and detachable petal-type lens hood. It showcases a minimalist black exterior with a Zeiss badge on the side of the barrel. Given the 35mm lens' fast aperture of F1.4, it excels at low-light photography.

== See also ==
- List of Sony E-mount lenses
- Sigma 35mm f/1.4 DG HSM Art
