= Sony FE 24-240mm F3.5-6.3 OSS =

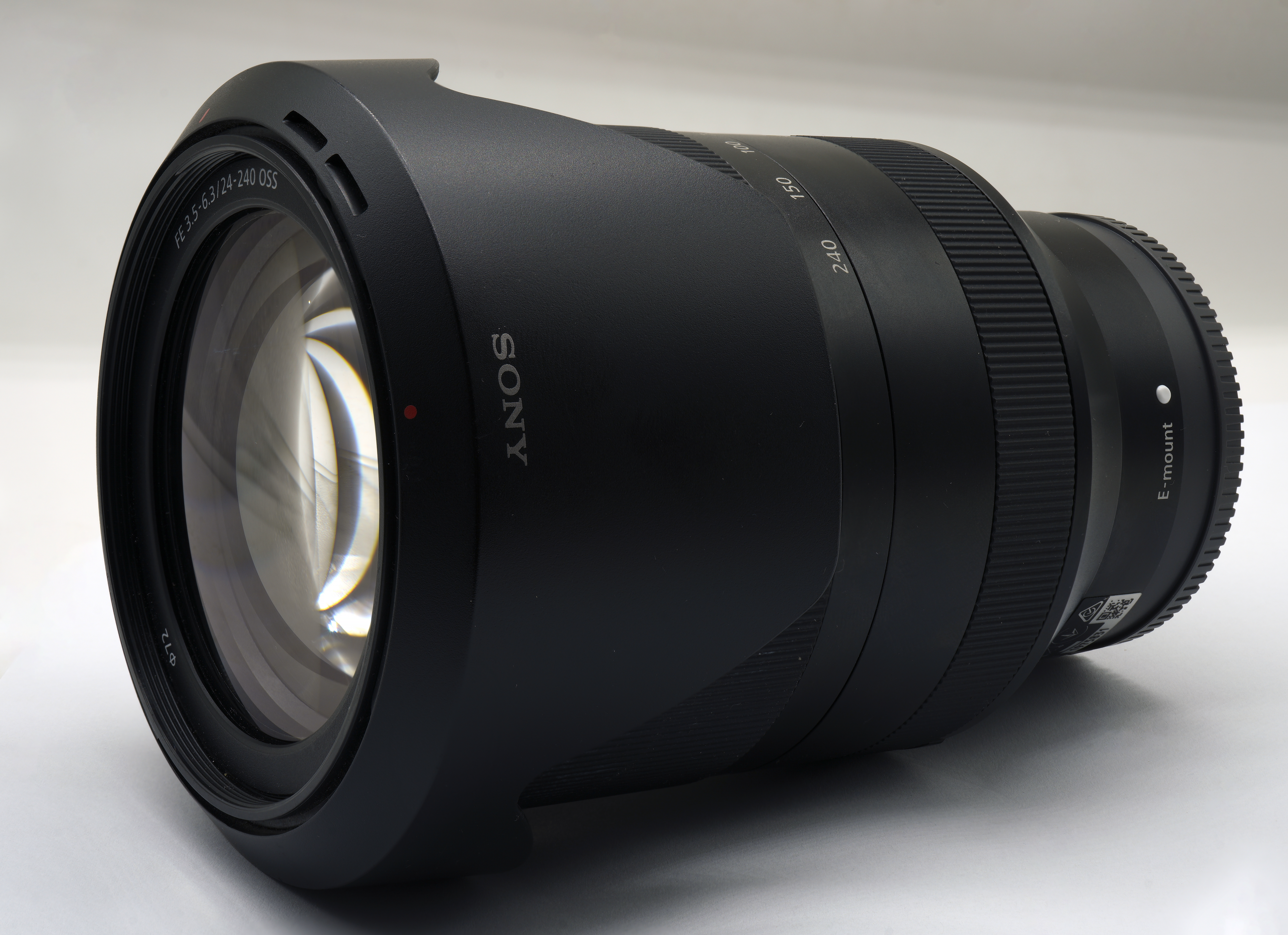
- Maker: Sony
- Lens mount(s): Sony E-mount

Technical data
- Type: Zoom
- Focus drive: Piezoelectric
- Focal length: 24-240mm
- Image format: 35mm full-frame
- Aperture (max/min): f/3.5 - f/6.3
- Close focus distance: 0.50 metres (1.6 ft)
- Max. magnification: 0.27
- Diaphragm blades: 7
- Construction: 17 elements in 12 groups

Features
- Manual focus override: Yes Yes
- Weather-sealing: Yes Yes
- Lens-based stabilization: Yes Yes
- Aperture ring: No No
- Application: Multipurpose

Physical
- Max. length: 118.5 millimetres (4.67 in)
- Diameter: 80.5 millimetres (3.17 in)
- Weight: 780 grams (1.72 lb)
- Filter diameter: 72mm

Accessories
- Lens hood: ALC-SH136

History
- Introduction: 2015

Retail info
- MSRP: $899 USD

The Sony FE 24-240mm F3.5-6.3 OSS is a variable maximum aperture full-frame (FE) superzoom lens for the Sony E-mount, announced by Sony on March 4, 2015.

Though designed for Sony's full frame E-mount cameras, the lens can be used on Sony's APS-C E-mount camera bodies, with an equivalent full-frame field-of-view of 36-360mm.

== Build Quality ==
The barrel of the lens telescopes outward from the main lens body as it's zoomed in from 24mm to 240mm. The lens does not feature a zoom lock but isn't easily susceptible to zoom creep thanks to a tighter zooming mechanism. It also features a weather resistant design.

== Features ==
The lens features Sony's OSS to help reduce motion blur while using slower shutter speeds. The maximum aperture of the lens varies from f/3.5 at 24mm to f/6.3 at 240mm. The 24-240 includes five aspherical lens elements and one ED lens. The front element does not rotate but uses two telescoping tubes to extend forward by 76.4 mm when the lens is zoomed from 24 mm to 240 mm.

== See also ==
- List of Sony E-mount lenses
- List of superzoom lenses
