= Sony Carl Zeiss Vario-Tessar T* E 16-70mm F4 ZA OSS =

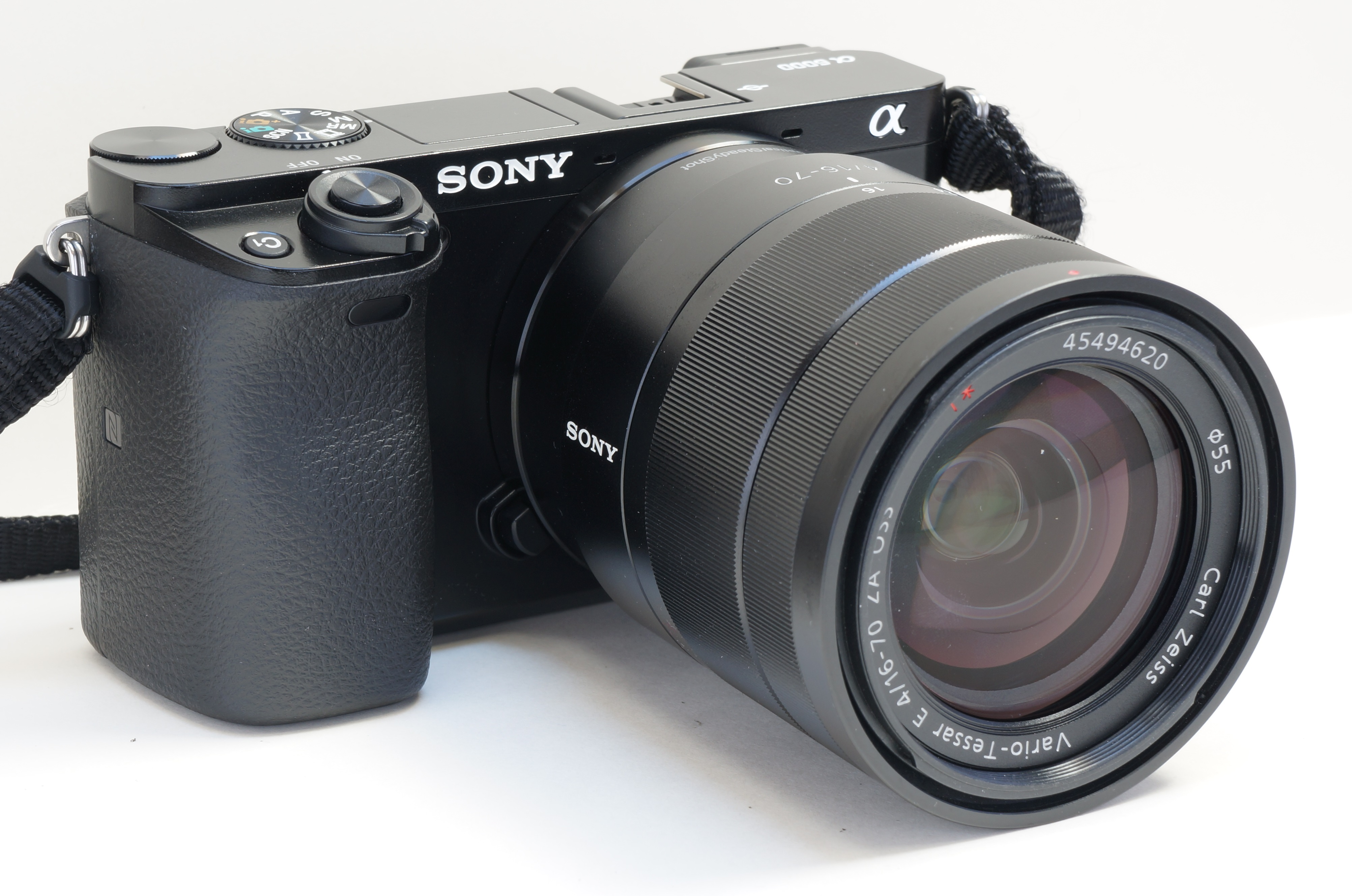
- Sony 16-70mm F4 ZA lens on a Sony α6000
- Maker: Sony
- Lens mount(s): Sony E-mount

Technical data
- Type: Zoom
- Focal length: 16-70mm
- Focal length (35mm equiv.): 24-105mm
- Image format: APS-C
- Aperture (max/min): f/4.0 -22.0
- Close focus distance: 0.35 metres (1.1 ft)
- Max. magnification: 0.23
- Diaphragm blades: 7
- Construction: 16 elements in 12 groups

Features
- Manual focus override: Yes Yes
- Weather-sealing: No No
- Lens-based stabilization: Yes Yes
- Aperture ring: No No
- Unique features: Carl Zeiss approved
- Application: Multipurpose

Physical
- Max. length: 75 millimetres (3.0 in)
- Diameter: 66.6 millimetres (2.62 in)
- Weight: 308 grams (0.679 lb)
- Filter diameter: 55mm

Accessories
- Lens hood: Petal-shape

History
- Introduction: 2013

Retail info
- MSRP: $899 USD

The Sony Zeiss Vario-Tessar T* E 16-70mm F4 ZA OSS is a constant maximum aperture zoom lens for the Sony E-mount, announced by Sony on August 27, 2013.

== Build quality ==
The lens showcases a minimalist black metal exterior with a Zeiss badge on the side of the barrel and no zoom lock to prevent zoom creep. Both the zoom and focus rings are metal. The barrel of the lens telescopes outward from the main lens body as it's zoomed in from 16mm to 70mm.

== Image quality ==
The lens has a tendency to be soft in the corners and toward the 70mm end of the lens' zoom range. However, the lens remains extremely sharp throughout the rest of the lens' zoom range with very minimal vignetting, distortion, and chromatic aberration.

== See also ==
- Sony E 18-55mm F3.5-5.6 OSS
- Sony E 18-105mm F4 G
- Zeiss Vario-Tessar
- List of Sony E-mount lenses
- List of standard zoom lenses
