= Sony E PZ 18-110mm F4 G OSS =

Photographic lens

- Maker: Sony
- Lens mount: Sony E-mount

Technical data
- Type: Zoom
- Focus drive: Stepper motor
- Focal length: 18-110mm
- Focal length (35mm equiv.): 27-165mm
- Image format: APS-C
- Aperture (max/min): f/4.0
- Close focus distance: 0.40 metres (1.3 ft)
- Max. magnification: 0.122x
- Diaphragm blades: 7
- Construction: 18 elements in 15 groups

Features
- Manual focus override: Yes Yes
- Weather-sealing: No No
- Lens-based stabilization: Yes Yes
- Aperture ring: Yes Yes
- Unique features: G-series
- Application: Multipurpose

Physical
- Max. length: 167.5 millimetres (6.59 in)
- Diameter: 109.2 millimetres (4.30 in)
- Weight: 1,105 grams (2.436 lb)
- Filter diameter: 95mm

Accessories
- Lens hood: Box/Cinema-style

History
- Introduction: 2016

Retail info
- MSRP: $3499 USD

The Sony E PZ 18-110mm F4 G OSS in photography is an advanced constant maximum aperture zoom lens for the Sony E-mount, announced by Sony on September 9, 2016.

It offers an 18-110mm zoom range (27-165mm full frame equivalent)

== See also ==
- List of Sony E-mount lenses
- Sony E PZ 18-105mm F4 G OSS
