= Sony α7S II =

2015 full-frame mirrorless camera

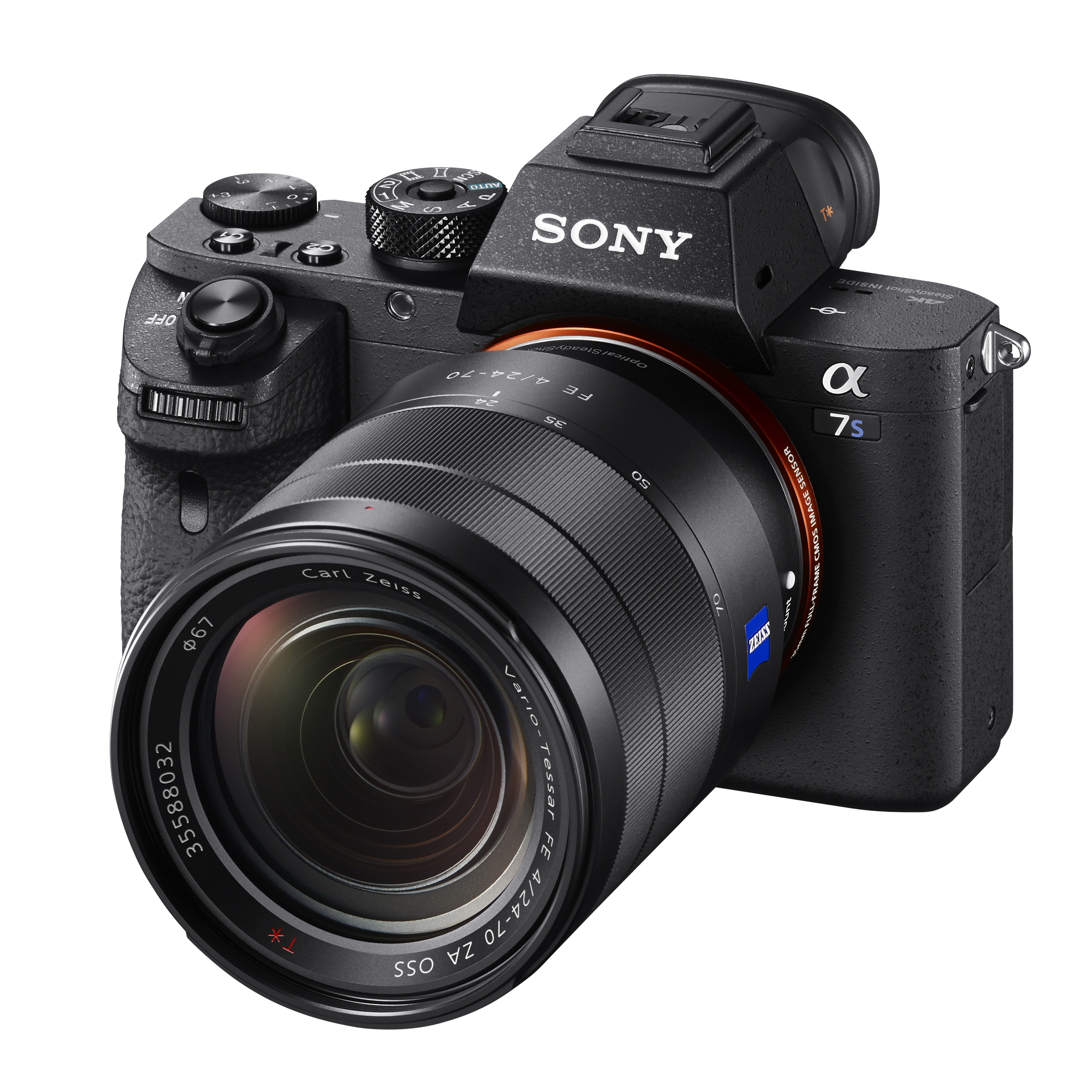
- Sony α7S II with Sony Carl Zeiss Vario-Tessar T* FE 24-70mm F4 ZA OSS lens

Overview
- Maker: Sony
- Type: Full-frame mirrorless interchangeable-lens camera
- Released: October 2015
- Intro price: US$3,000 (2015); US$2,399 (2018)

Lens
- Lens mount: Sony E-mount
- Lens: Interchangeable lens

Sensor/medium
- Sensor type: CMOS
- Sensor size: 35.6 × 23.8 mm (full frame type)
- Maximum resolution: 4240 × 2832 (12 megapixels)
- Film speed: ISO 50-409600
- Recording medium: Multi slot for Memory Stick Duo/SD memory card

Focusing
- Focus areas: 169 focus points

Shutter
- Frame rate: 120fp
- Shutter speeds: 1/8000 s to 30 s
- Continuous shooting: 5.0 frames per second

Viewfinder
- Viewfinder: Electronic viewfinder
- Viewfinder magnification: 0.78
- Frame coverage: 100%

Image processing
- Image processor: Bionz X
- White balance: Yes

General
- Video recording: 4K UHD (QFHD: 3840 x 2160)
- LCD screen: 3 inches with 1,228,800 dots
- Dimensions: 127×96×60 mm (5.0×3.8×2.4 in)
- Weight: 627 g (22.1 oz) including battery
- Made in: China

The Sony α7S II (model ILCE-7SM2) is a 12.2-megapixel full-frame mirrorless interchangeable-lens camera made by Sony. It was publicly announced on September 11, 2015 at a press conference held at the IBC 2015 exhibition in Amsterdam and was released in October 2015 with a suggested retail price of US$3,000 (body only) at the time.

The α7S II is offered as a body only or in a package with a Sony FE 28-70mm F3.5-5.6 OSS zoom lens. It was succeeded by the Sony α7S III in October 2020.

== Features ==
=== Image features ===
The α7S II features a 35mm (35.6 x 23.8 mm) full-frame Exmor CMOS sensor capable of capturing approximately 12.2 effective megapixels.

=== Autofocus and metering ===
The camera's 169-point autofocus sensors use contrast-detection AF to capture and record.

=== ISO ===
For still images, the α7S II's ISO is 100–102400 with expansion down to ISO 50 and up to ISO 409600 equivalent. For movies, the α7S II's ISO is 100-102400 equivalent with expansion down to ISO 100 and up to ISO 409600 equivalent. For still images or movies on auto setting, the camera's ISO is 100–12800 with selectable lower and upper limits.

=== Shutter ===
The α7S II's shutter speed range is 30 s to 1/8,000 s for still images. For bulb movies, the shutter speed range is 1/4 s (1/3 s step) to 1/8,000 s.

The camera has an approximate maximum continuous shooting speed of 5.0 frames per second in Speedy Priority Continuous shooting drive mode and a shooting speed of 2.5 frames per second in Continuous shooting drive mode.

=== Ergonomics and functions ===
The α7S II has a TFT LCD screen with a size of 7.5 cm (3 inches) and resolution of 1,228,800 dots with an adjustable tilt angle of 107 degrees up and 41 degrees down (approximate). The OLED electronic viewfinder has a resolution of 2,360,000 dots and a .78x magnification.

The camera additionally has built-in Wi-Fi with NFC compatibility.

=== Video ===
The camera can record 4K UHD (QFHD: 3840 x 2160) internally in full frame format. The camera allows for movie image size to be set, as well as the frame rate per second, and compression method.

The Possession of Hannah Grace was filmed entirely using the A7S II

== Firmware update ==
On May 15, 2019, Sony announced batch firmware updates for the α9 and α7 line of cameras including firmware version 3.01 for the α7S II; its main change was improving overall stability of the camera body.

== International Space Station ==
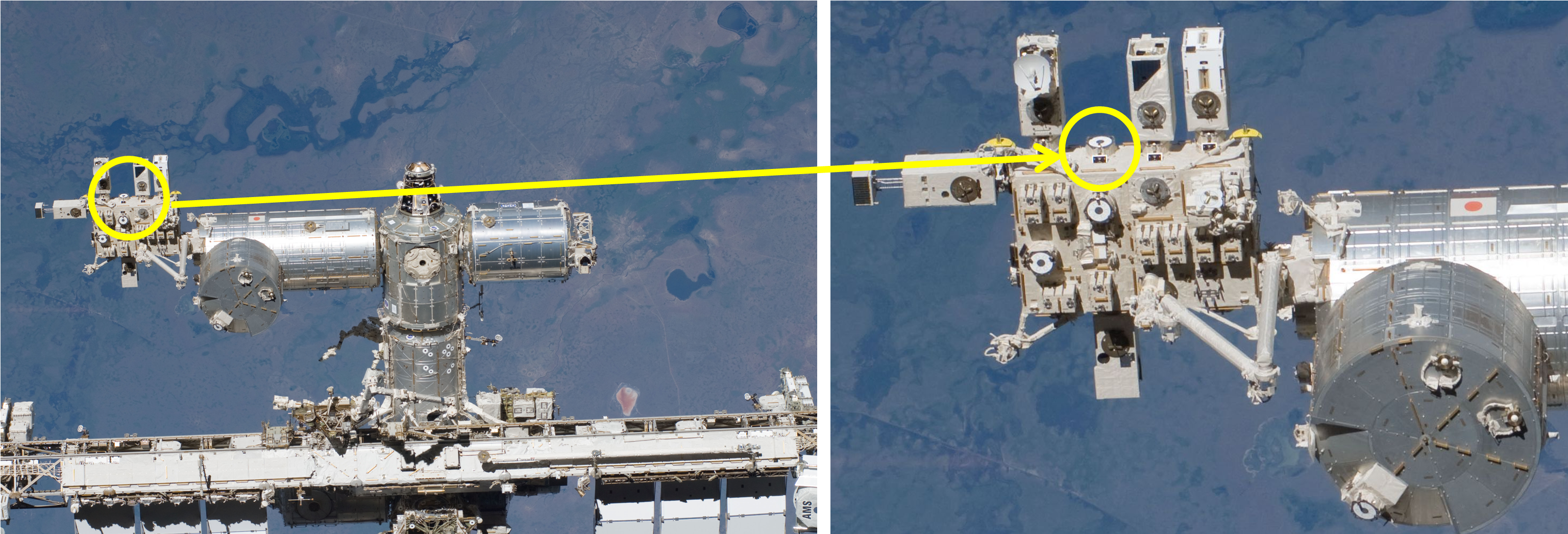
Camera mounting on ISS

In December 2016, Japan's national aero-space agency, JAXA, installed a Sony α7S II outside the International Space Station's KIBO Japanese Experiment Module after determining it would be durable enough to withstand the vacuum of outer space. According to Sony, the a7S II captured the first 4K footage in space using a commercial level camera. In order to mitigate the temperature extremes of outer space, the camera mount is equipped with a heater and radiator. Sony stated that the camera body was not modified but the software was modified to include the ability for full remote control from inside the Space Station. JAXA selected the Sony FE PZ 28-135mm F4 G OSS lens to capture images and record video for the purpose of this assignment.

== Accessories ==
According to Sony's website, the α7S II model comes equipped with:

- Sony ILCE-7SM2 Camera Body
- Battery Pack NP-FW50 (rechargeable)
- Battery Charger BC-VW1
- AC Adapter AC-UUD11
- Neck/Shoulder Strap
- Micro-USB Cable and Cable Protector

== See also ==
- Comparison of Sony α7 cameras
- List of cameras on the International Space Station
- List of Sony E-mount cameras
- Sony α7II

Family	Level	Format	'10	2011		2012	2013	2014	2015	2016	2017	2018	2019	2020	2021	2022	2023	2024	2025	2026
Alpha (α)	Indust	FF																ILX-LR1 ^{●}		
Alpha (α)	Cine line	FF													_{m} FX6 ^{●}					
Alpha (α)	Cine line	FF													_{m} FX3 ^{AT●}					
Alpha (α)	Cine line	FF																		_{m} FX2 ^{AT●}
Alpha (α)	Flag	FF													_{m} α1 ^{FT●}				_{m} α1 II ^{FAT●}	
Alpha (α)	Speed	FF										_{m} α9 ^{FT●}			_{m} α9 II ^{FT●}				_{m} α9 III ^{FAT●}	
Alpha (α)	Sens	FF							_{m} α7S ^{●}	_{m} α7S II ^{F●}					_{m} α7S III ^{AT●}					
Alpha (α)	Hi-Res	FF						_{m} α7R ^{●}		_{m} α7R II ^{F●}		_{m} α7R III ^{FT●}		_{m} α7R IV ^{FT●}			_{m} α7R V ^{FAT●}			
Alpha (α)	Basic	FF						_{m} α7 ^{F●}	_{m} α7 II ^{F●}				_{m} α7 III ^{FT●}			_{m} α7 IV ^{AT●}				
Alpha (α)	Compact	FF																_{m} α7CR ^{AT●}		
Alpha (α)	Compact	FF													_{m} α7C ^{AT●}			_{m} α7C II ^{AT●}		
Alpha (α)	Vlog	FF																_{m} ZV-E1 ^{AT●}		
Alpha (α)	Cine	APS-C															_{m} FX30 ^{AT●}			
Alpha (α)	Adv	APS-C			_{s} NEX-7 ^{F●}						_{m} α6500 ^{FT●}			_{m} α6600 ^{FT●}				_{m} α6700 ^{AT●}		
Alpha (α)	Mid-range	APS-C				_{m} NEX-6 ^{F●}					_{m} α6300 ^{F●}		_{m} α6400 ^{F+T●}							
Alpha (α)	Mid-range	APS-C						_{m} α6000 ^{F●}						_{m} α6100 ^{FT●}						
Alpha (α)	Vlog	APS-C														_{m} ZV-E10 ^{AT●}			_{m} ZV-E10 II ^{AT●}	
Alpha (α)	Entry-level	APS-C	NEX-5 ^{F●}	NEX-5N ^{FT●}		NEX-5R ^{F+T●}	NEX-5T ^{F+T●}		α5100 ^{F+T●}											
Alpha (α)	Entry-level	APS-C	NEX-3 ^{F●}	NEX-C3 ^{F●}		NEX-F3 ^{F+●}	NEX-3N ^{F+●}	α5000 ^{F+●}												
DSLR-style		APS-C					_{m} α3000 ^{●}		_{m} α3500 ^{●}											
SmartShot		APS-C							QX1 ^{M●}											
CineAlta	Cine line	FF										VENICE				VENICE 2				
CineAlta	Cine line	FF																BURANO		
XDCAM	Cine line	FF												_{m} FX9						
XDCAM	Docu	S35							_{m} FS7		_{m} FS7 II									
XDCAM	Mobile	S35								_{m} FS5			_{m} FS5 II							
NXCAM	Pro	S35		NEX-FS100		NEX-FS700	NEX-FS700R													
NXCAM	APS-C					NEX-EA50														
Handycam	FF					_{m} NEX-VG900														
Handycam	APS-C		_{s} NEX-VG10		_{s} NEX-VG20	_{m} NEX-VG30														
Security		FF									SNC-VB770									
Security		FF									UMC-S3C									
Family	Level	Format																		
Family	Level	Format	'10	2011		2012	2013	2014	2015	2016	2017	2018	2019	2020	2021	2022	2023	2024	2025	2026
