= Sony E PZ 16-50mm F3.5-5.6 OSS =

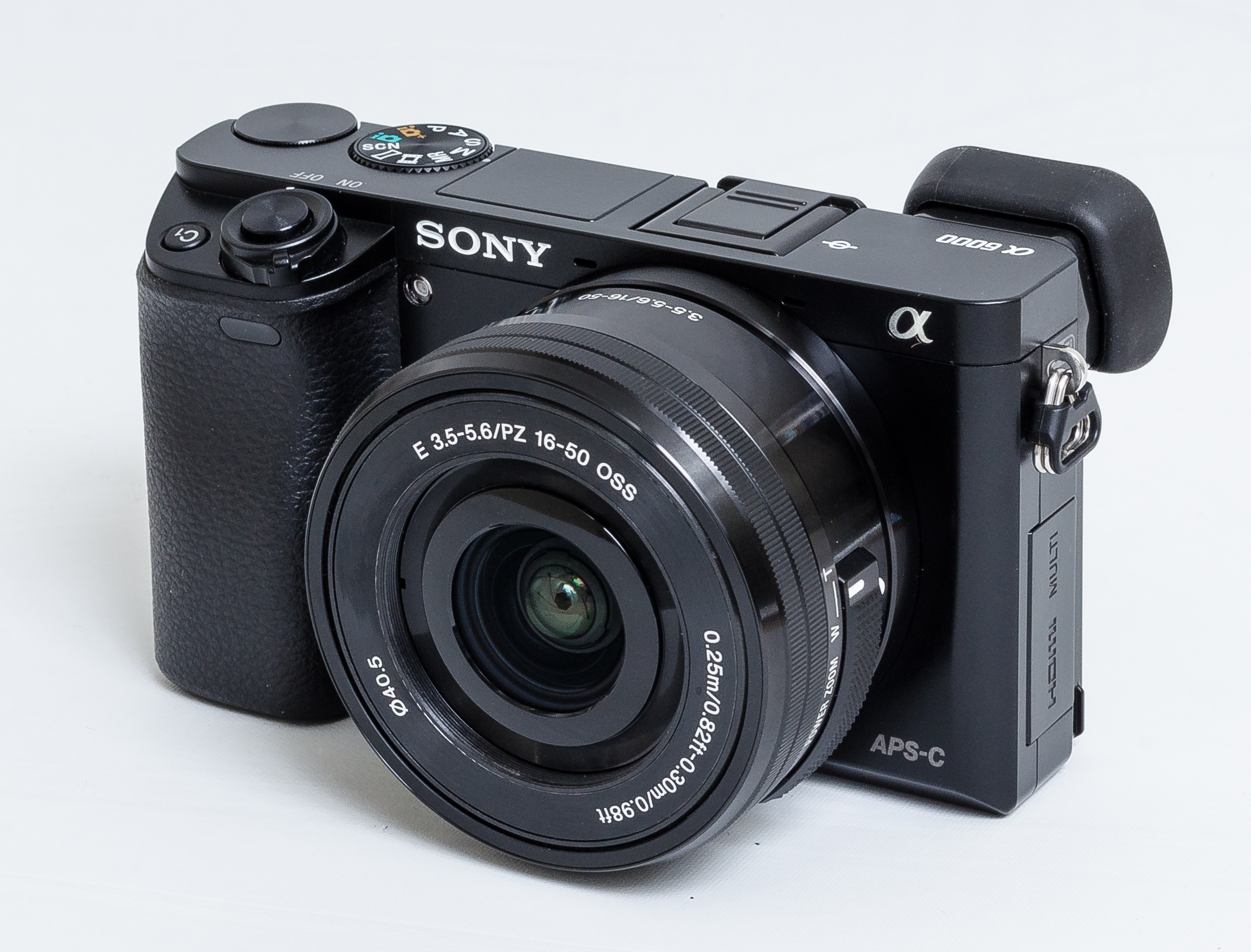
- Sony 16-50mm lens attached to the Sony α6000
- Maker: Sony
- Lens mount(s): Sony E-mount

Technical data
- Type: Zoom
- Focus drive: Micromotor
- Focal length: 16-50mm
- Focal length (35mm equiv.): 24-75mm
- Image format: APS-C
- Aperture (max/min): f/3.5-5.6
- Close focus distance: 0.249 metres (0.82 ft)
- Max. magnification: 0.215x
- Diaphragm blades: 7
- Construction: 9 elements in 8 groups

Features
- Manual focus override: Yes Yes
- Weather-sealing: No No
- Lens-based stabilization: Yes Yes
- Aperture ring: No No
- Unique features: Power Zoom, Pancake lens
- Application: Multipurpose

Physical
- Max. length: 29.9 millimetres (1.18 in)
- Diameter: 64.7 millimetres (2.55 in)
- Weight: 116 grams (0.256 lb)
- Filter diameter: 40.5mm

Accessories
- Lens hood: None

History
- Introduction: 2012

Retail info
- MSRP: $348 USD

The Sony E PZ 16-50mm F3.5-5.6 OSS is a variable maximum aperture standard zoom lens for the Sony E-mount, announced by Sony on September 12, 2012, and released January 2013. The lens is often bundled with various Sony Alpha mirrorless cameras as a "kit lens".

== Build quality ==
The lens features a compact construction colloquially referred to as a "pancake lens" and a micromotor-driven power zoom controlled by a switch on the side of the lens and the dual-role focus/zoom ring when the camera is not set to manual focus. Given the lens' focal length of 16-50mm, it is generally regarded as a multipurpose lens, though underperforms in low light situations due to its slower variable minimum aperture of f/3.5-5.6.

== Image quality ==
The lens has a tendency to produce somewhat soft images, especially near the corners of the image throughout its zoom range. Through the in-lens corrective programming, chromatic aberration and vignetting are reduced by the camera. Vignetting always remains visible with uniform backgrounds, especially at 16mm and always requires out-of-camera correction for applications like product photography. Lens distortion can be seen through at the 16mm end of its zoom range, but gradually fades away toward the 50mm end.

== See also ==
- Sony E 18-55mm F3.5-5.6 OSS
- Sony E 16-70mm F4 ZA OSS
- List of Sony E-mount lenses
- List of standard zoom lenses
