= Sony E 10-18mm F4 OSS =

Sony E 10-18mm F4.0 OSS
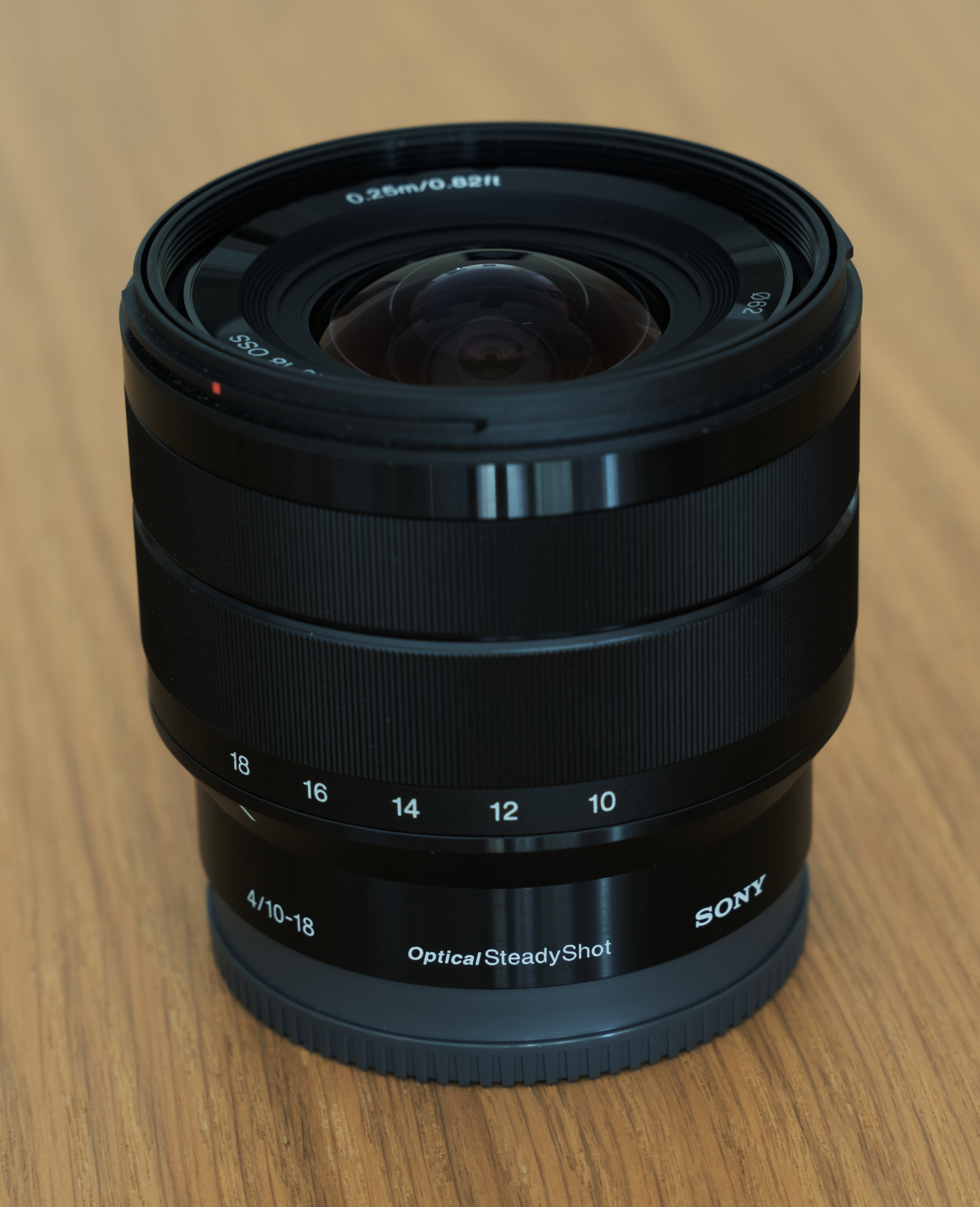
- Maker: Sony
- Lens mount(s): Sony E-mount

Technical data
- Type: Zoom
- Focus drive: Micromotor
- Focal length: 10-18mm
- Focal length (35mm equiv.): 15-27mm
- Image format: APS-C
- Aperture (max/min): f/4.0 - 22.0
- Close focus distance: 0.25 metres (0.82 ft)
- Max. magnification: 0.1x
- Diaphragm blades: 7
- Construction: 10 elements in 8 groups

Features
- Manual focus override: Yes Yes
- Weather-sealing: No No
- Lens-based stabilization: Yes Yes
- Aperture ring: No No
- Application: Landscape, architecture

Physical
- Max. length: 63.5 millimetres (2.50 in)
- Diameter: 70.0 millimetres (2.76 in)
- Weight: 225 grams (0.496 lb)
- Filter diameter: 62mm

Accessories
- Lens hood: Petal-type

History
- Introduction: 2012

Retail info
- MSRP: $848 USD

The Sony E 10-18mm F4 OSS is a constant maximum aperture ultra-wide angle zoom lens for the Sony E-mount announced by Sony on September 12, 2012, and released January 2013.

== Build quality ==
The lens showcases a minimalist black exterior made of plastic. The barrel of the lens telescopes outward from the main lens body as it is zoomed in from 10mm to 18mm.

== Other features ==
While the 10-18mm F4 OSS is officially intended as an APS-C lens, it can be used with a full-frame sensor camera without hard vignetting between 12mm and 16mm focal lengths while the lens hood is removed, without needing to crop to APS-C, as the rear element still has adequate coverage over the larger full-frame sensor, although such usage is not endorsed or supported by Sony.

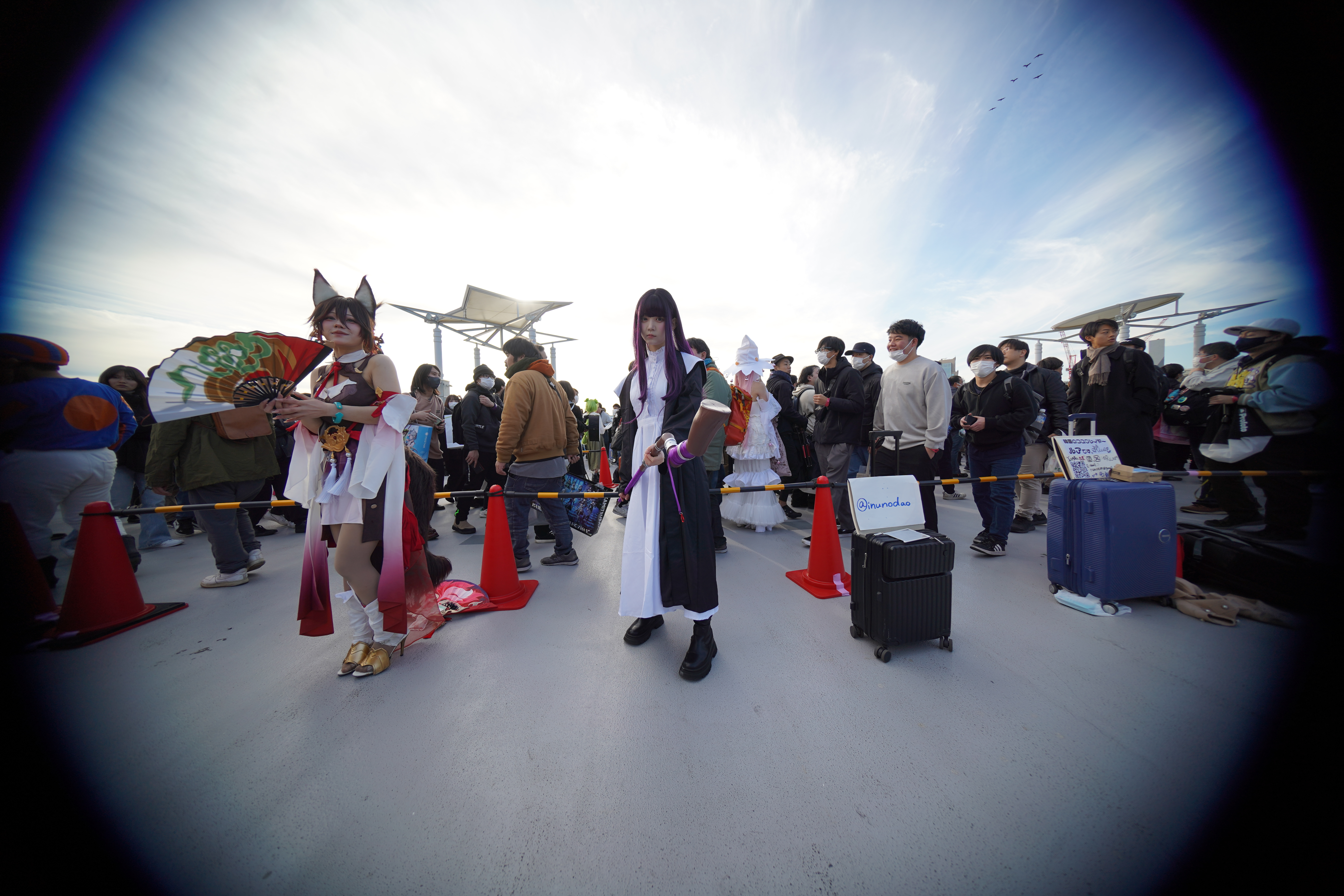
10mm

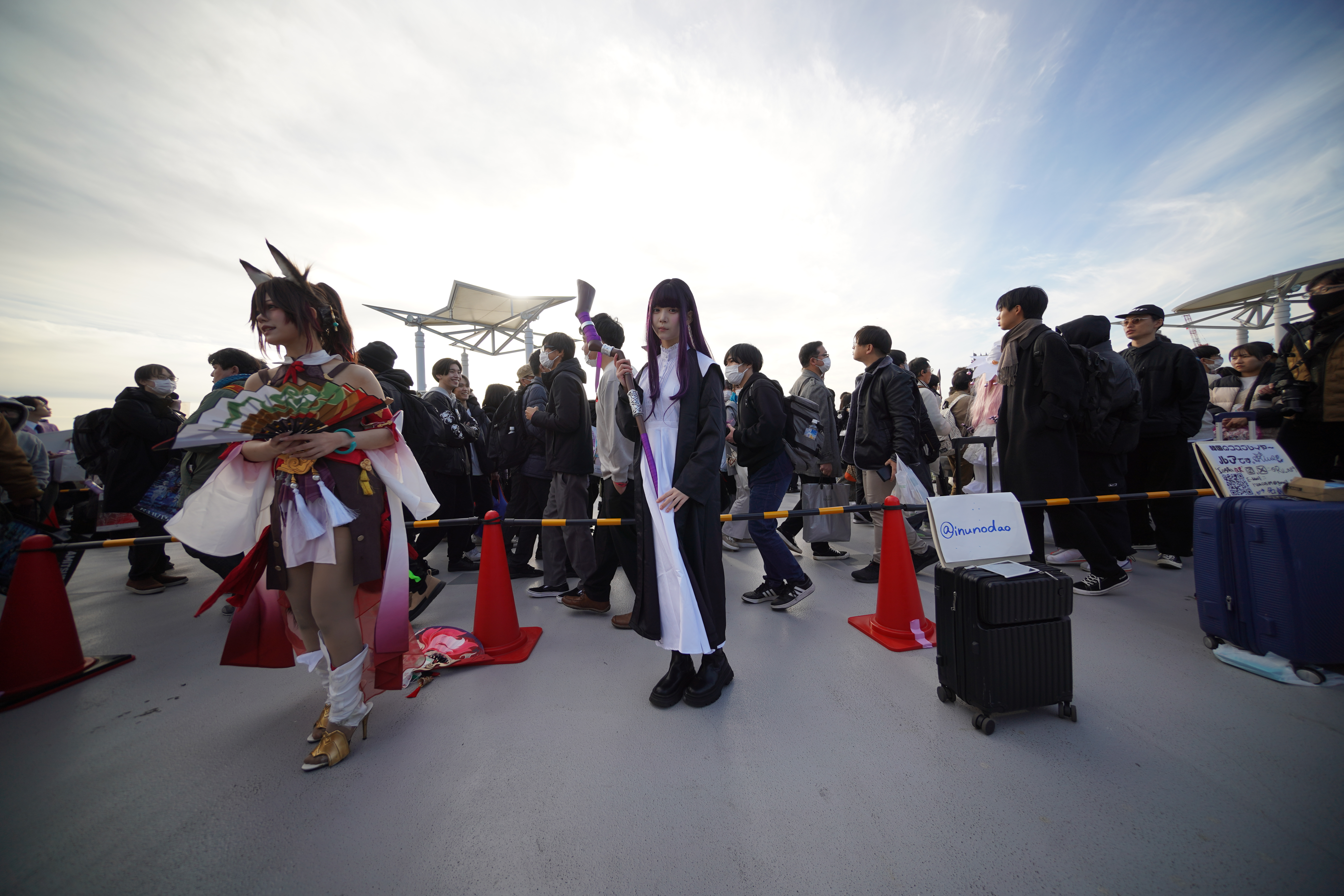
12mm

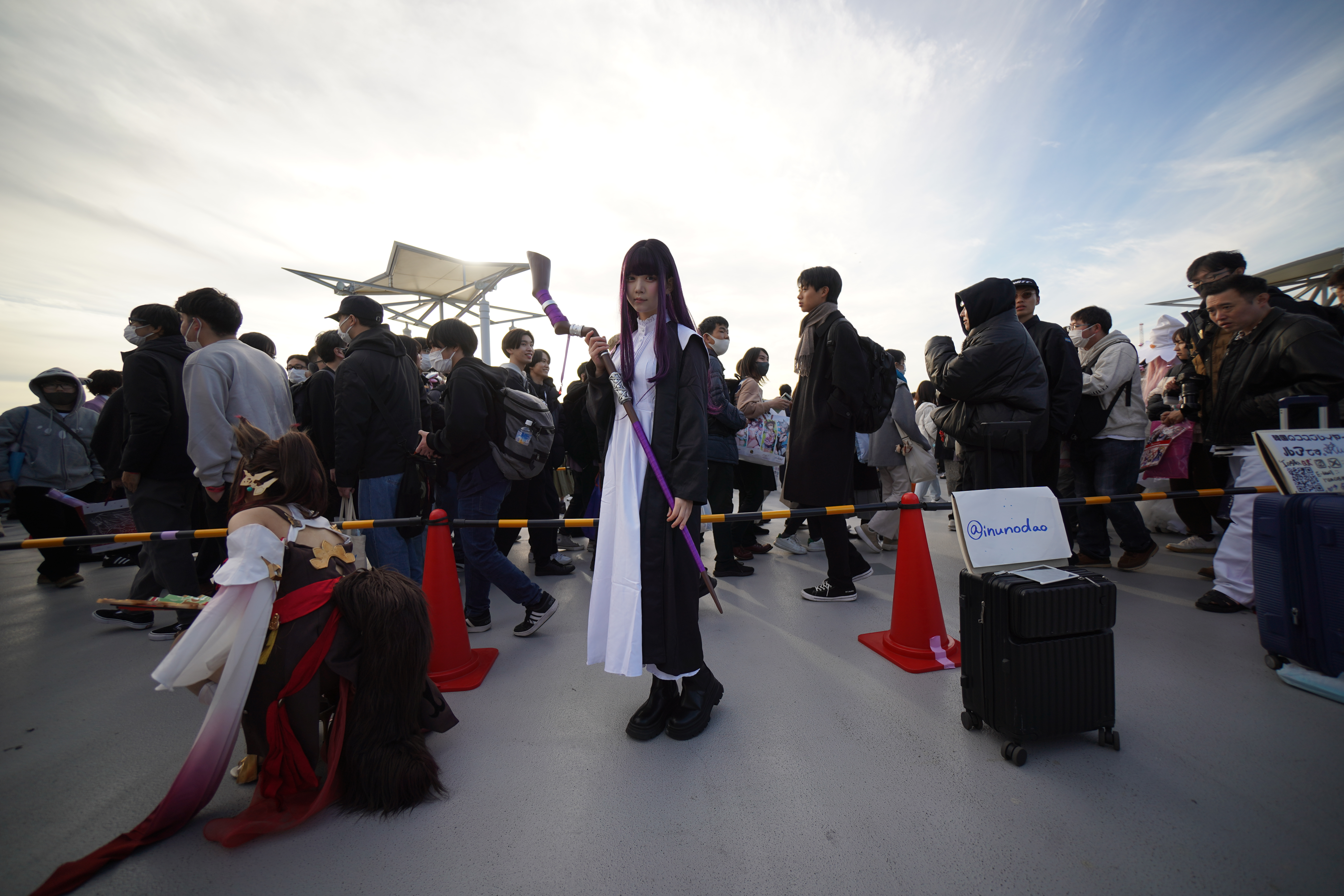
14mm

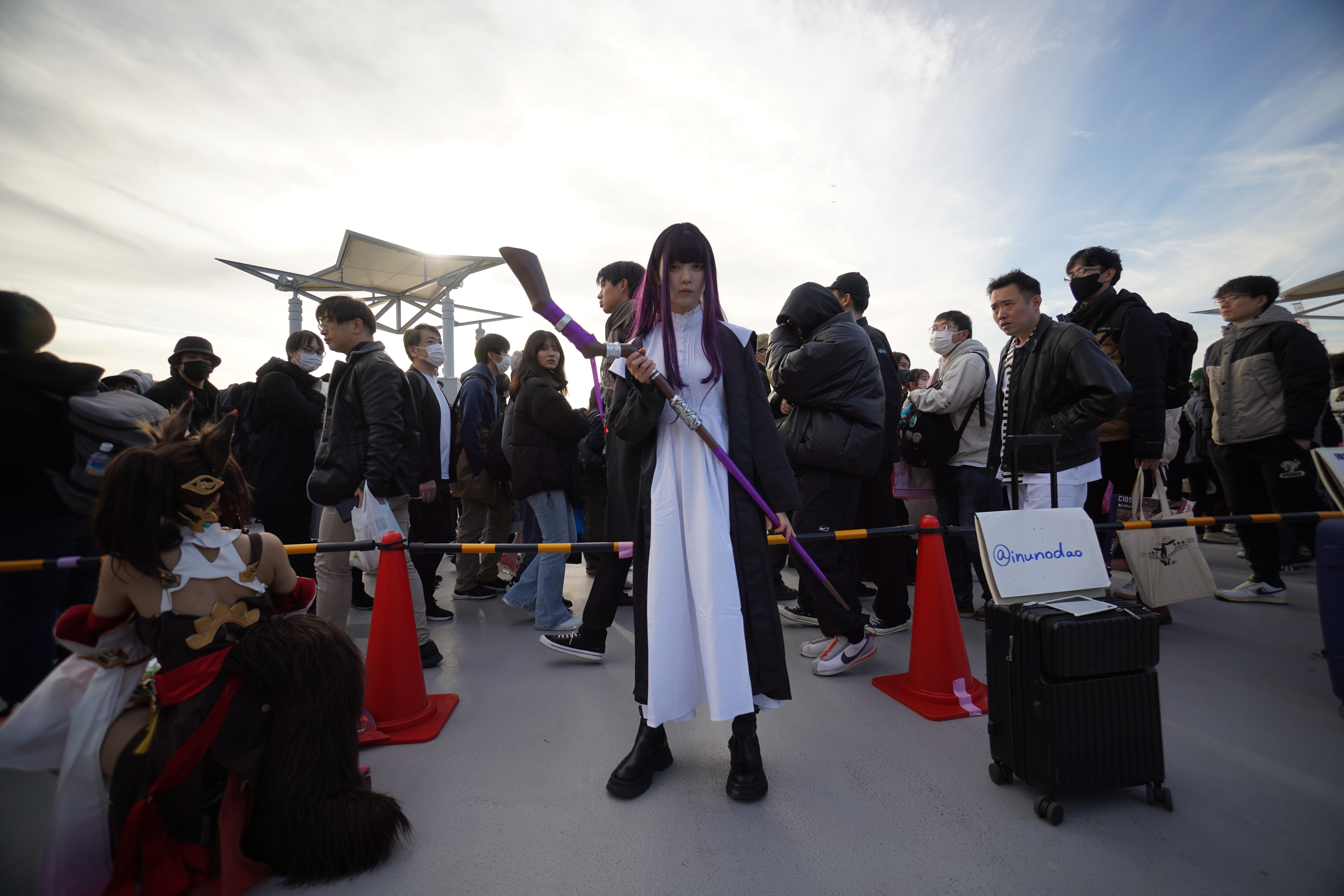
16mm

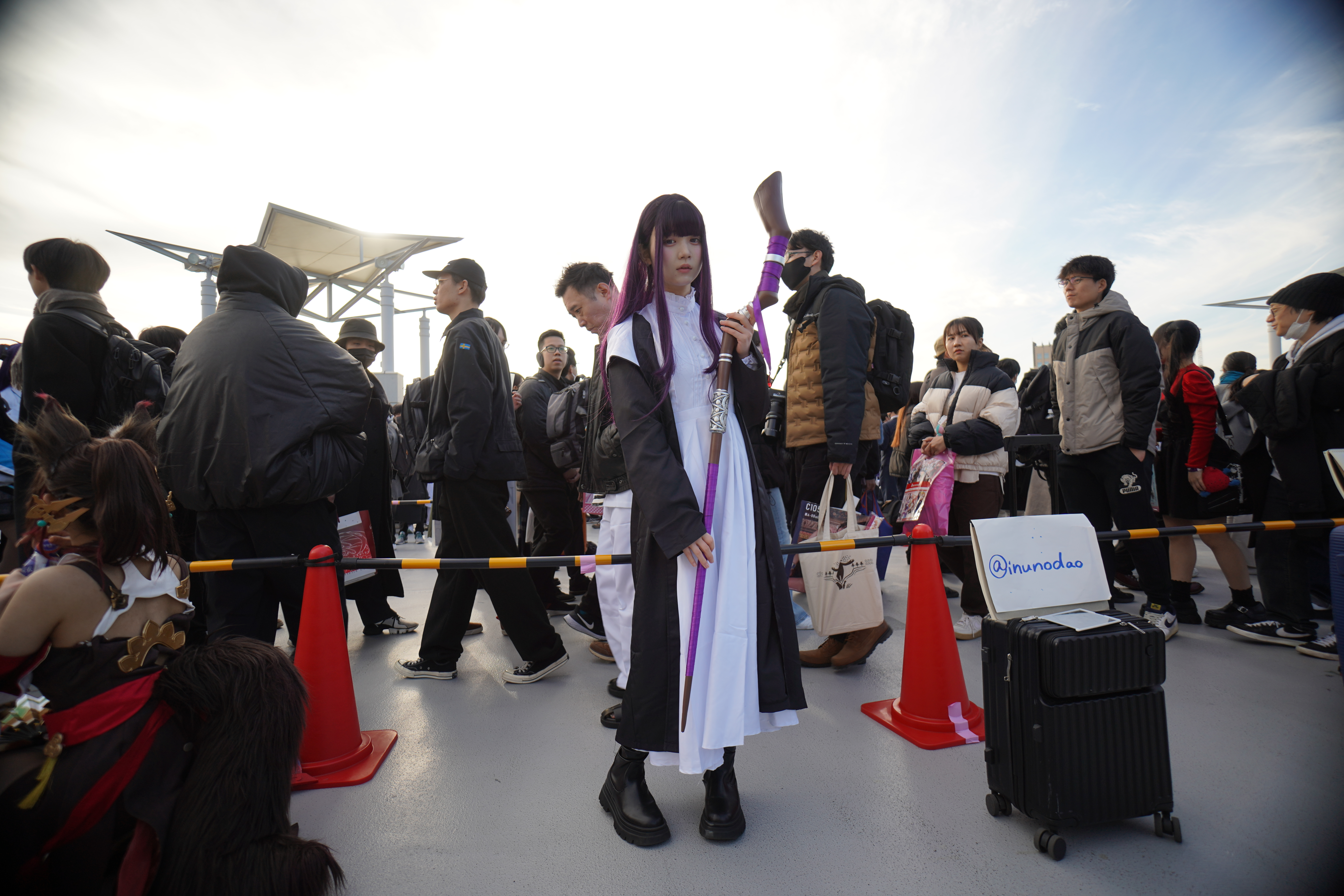
18mm

Demonstration of the Sony E 10-18mm F4 OSS being used on a full-frame camera, with APS-C crop mode turned off. Between 12mm and 16mm focal lengths, hard vignetting is absent along the corners. Some soft darkening appears at 12mm focal length, which can be remedied in post-processing.

== See also ==
- List of Sony E-mount lenses
