= Sony E 35mm F1.8 OSS =

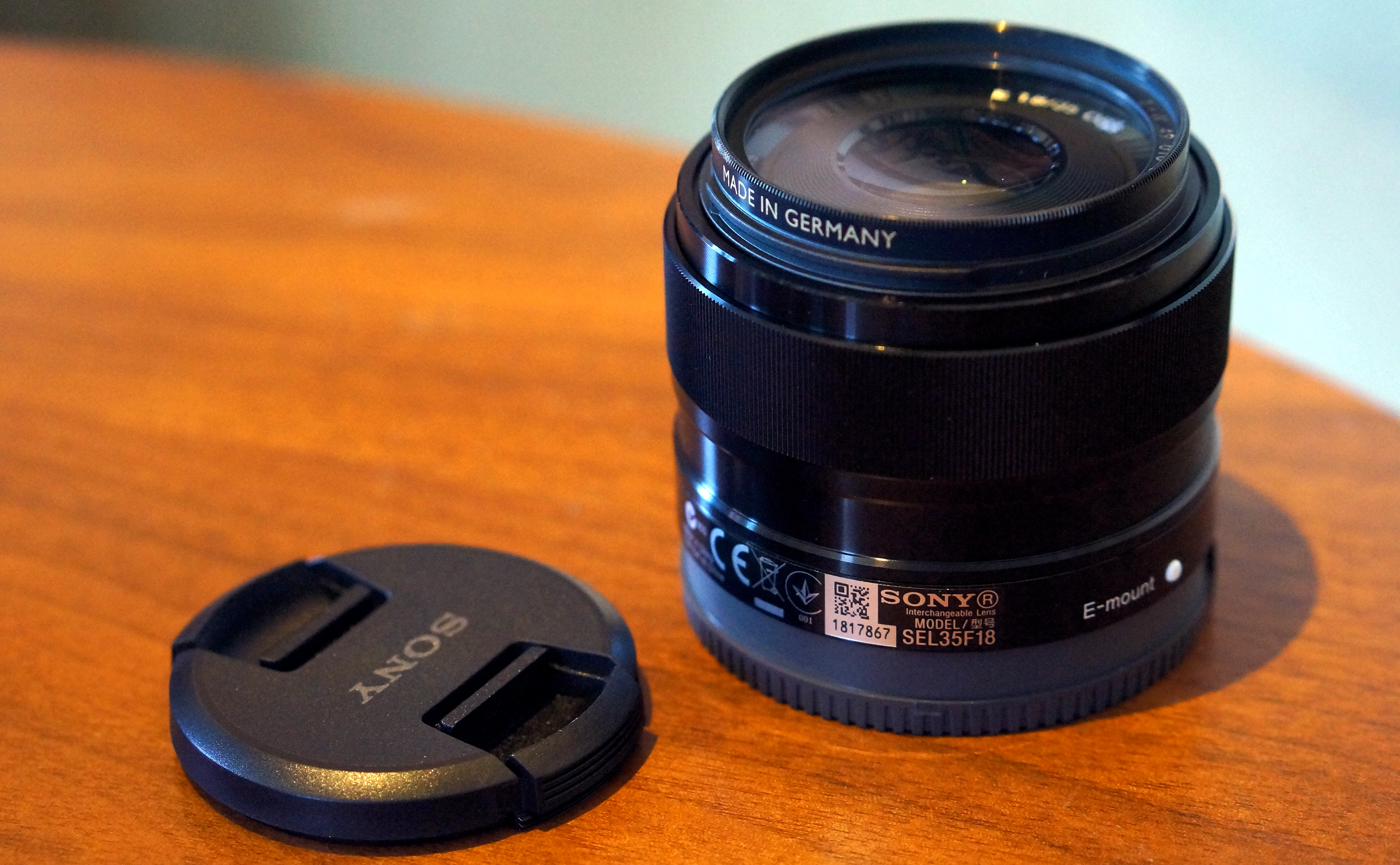
- Maker: Sony
- Lens mount(s): Sony E-mount

Technical data
- Type: Prime
- Focus drive: Autofocus
- Focal length: 35mm
- Focal length (35mm equiv.): 52.5mm
- Image format: APS-C
- Aperture (max/min): f/1.8-22
- Close focus distance: 0.30 metres (0.98 ft)
- Max. magnification: 0.215x
- Diaphragm blades: 7
- Construction: 8 elements in 6 groups

Features
- Manual focus override: Yes Yes
- Weather-sealing: No No
- Lens-based stabilization: Yes Yes
- Aperture ring: No No
- Application: Multipurpose

Physical
- Diameter: 64.7 millimetres (2.55 in)
- Weight: 155 grams (0.342 lb)
- Filter diameter: 49mm

Accessories
- Lens hood: Petal-type lens hood

History
- Introduction: 2012

Retail info
- MSRP: $448 USD

The Sony E 35mm F1.8 OSS is a standard prime lens for the Sony E-mount, released by Sony on September 12, 2012.

== Build quality ==
The lens has a black plastic exterior in a high quality finish. Its autofocus is fast and silent.

== Image quality ==
Wide open the sharpness of the lens is about average in the corners and good in the center but stopping down sharpness increases reaching its sweet-spot at f/5.6.

Distortion is very low (barrel shaped), vignetting mild wide open. Chromatic aberrations are visible especially when shooting against the sun.

Bokeh is soft especially wide open. Colour rendition is neutral.

== See also ==
- List of Sony E-mount lenses
- Sony Carl Zeiss Sonnar T* FE 35mm F2.8 ZA
- Samyang Optics / Rokinon AF 35 mm f/2.8 FE
