= Sony E 18-50mm F4-5.6 =

- Maker: Sony
- Lens mount(s): Sony E-mount

Technical data
- Type: Zoom
- Focal length: 18-50mm
- Focal length (35mm equiv.): 27-75mm
- Image format: APS-C
- Aperture (max/min): f/4-5.6

Features
- Manual focus override: No No
- Weather-sealing: No No
- Lens-based stabilization: No No
- Aperture ring: No No
- Application: Multipurpose

Physical
- Filter diameter: 55mm

History
- Introduction: 2014
- Discontinuation: 2016

Retail info
- MSRP: $376 USD

The Sony E 18-50mm F4-5.6 is a variable maximum aperture standard zoom lens for the Sony E-mount, announced by Sony in March 2014. The lens was bundled with the Sony α3500 and sold exclusively in Australia, Mexico, Russia, Eastern Europe, the Middle East, and Africa.

The lens was discontinued by Sony in late 2016.

== Build quality ==
The lens features a plastic exterior over plastic internals and a rubber focus ring, similar to that of the Sony FE 50mm F1.8 lens. It showcases recessed front lens element, focusing ring, and a matte black finish. The lens does not feature image stabilization.

== See also ==
- List of Sony E-mount lenses
- Sony E 18-55mm F3.5-5.6 OSS
