= Sony FE 100mm F2.8 Macro GM OSS =

Sony lens

- Sony 100mm Macro in upright position
- Maker: Sony
- Lens mount: Sony E-mount
- Part number: SEL100M28GM

Technical data
- Type: Prime
- Focus drive: four XD (extreme dynamic) linear motors
- Focal length: 100mm
- Image format: 35mm full-frame
- Aperture (max/min): f/2.8 (22)
- Close focus distance: 0.26 metres (0.85 ft)
- Max. magnification: 1:1.4 (1.4×)
- Diaphragm blades: 11 blades, circular
- Construction: 17 elements in 13 groups

Features
- Manual focus override: Yes Yes
- Weather-sealing: Yes Yes
- Lens-based stabilization: Yes Yes
- Macro capable: Yes Yes
- Aperture ring: Yes Yes
- Unique features: GM series, internal focusing with floating elements, dedicated macro lens with max. magnification 1.4x, automatic stabilisation now extended to Z-axis in addition to horizontal, vertical and angular stabilisation.
- Application: portrait, macro

Physical
- Min. length: 148 millimetres (5.8 in)
- Max. length: 148 millimetres (5.8 in)
- Diameter: 81 millimetres (3.2 in)
- Weight: 646 grams (1.424 lb)
- Filter diameter: 67mm
- Color: black

Software
- Lens spec: "FE 100mm F2.8 Macro GM OSS"

Accessories
- Lens hood: bayonet, round
- Case: pouch

History
- Introduction: 2025

Retail info
- MSRP: $1500 USD (as of 2025)

The Sony FE 100mm F2.8 Macro GM OSS is a full-frame macro prime lens for the Sony E-mount, announced by Sony on 30 September 2025.

As of November 2025, the 100mm Macro lens is one of 4 E-mount lenses manufactured by Sony that are specifically designed for macro photography, with the others being the Sony FE 90mm F2.8 Macro G OSS, the Sony FE 50mm F2.8 Macro and Sony E 30mm F3.5 Macro lenses. Though designed for Sony's full frame E-mount cameras, this lens can be used on Sony's APS-C E-mount camera bodies, producing a field-of-view equivalent on full frame of 150mm.

== Build quality ==
The lens features a weather resistant plastic exterior with a matte black finish. The lens is currently the second Sony E-mount lens to feature an external focusing ring, which can be pulled up or down relative to the lens body to switch quickly between manual and autofocus. On the side of the lens are a number of external switches controlling the lens' focusing range, image stabilization and more.

Due to internal floating elements this lens does not elongate when focusing. It sports four autofocus motors that make focusing fast and accurate on all Sony E-mount cameras.

== Features ==
- Enhanced maximum magnification ratio: max. 1.4× magnification at closest focus
- Both the Sony 1.4× and the 2× teleconverter may be attached to this lens. This extends both the maximum magnification ratio and the working distance:
  - with the 1.4× teleconverter attached the maximum magnification ratio rises to 2.0×.
  - with the 2× teleconverter attached the maximum magnification ratio rises to 2.8×.
- The automatic image stabilisation has now also been extended to the Z-axis (near-far) in addition to horizontal, vertical and angular stabilisation.

== See also ==
- List of Sony E-mount lenses
