= Sony FE 50–150 mm F2 GM =

Sony FE 50-150mm F2.0 GM
- Maker: Sony
- Lens mount: Sony E-mount

Technical data
- Type: Zoom
- Focus drive: 4 XD linear motors
- Focal length: 50-150mm
- Image format: 35mm full-frame
- Aperture (max/min): f/2.0
- Close focus distance: 0.4–0.74 metres (1.3–2.4 ft)
- Max. magnification: 0.2
- Diaphragm blades: 11
- Construction: 19 elements in 17 groups

Features
- Manual focus override: Yes Yes
- Weather-sealing: Yes Yes
- Lens-based stabilization: No No
- Aperture ring: Yes Yes
- Unique features: G Master series lens
- Application: Landscape, Portrait

Physical
- Max. length: 200 millimetres (7.9 in)
- Diameter: 102.8 millimetres (4.05 in)
- Weight: 1,340 grams (47 oz)
- Filter diameter: 95mm

Accessories
- Lens hood: ALC-SH183
- Case: soft case

History
- Introduction: 2025

Retail info
- MSRP: $3,899 USD

The Sony FE 50-150mm F2.0 GM is a full-frame constant maximum aperture, telephoto zoom lens for the Sony E-mount, announced by Sony in 2025.

== Description ==
The Sony FE 50-150mm F2.0 GM lens is the first full-frame telephoto zoom lens with constant f/2 aperture. The lens can be used on Sony's APS-C E-mount camera bodies, with an equivalent full-frame field-of-view of 75-225mm. The 50-150mm F2.0 GM lens is aimed at portrait, wedding, event and indoor sports photographers. It replaces three prime lenses, 50mm, 85mm and 135mm, typically used by such photographers, avoiding the need to swap lenses during a photo-shoot. The wide maximum aperture allows fast shutter speeds with low indoor lighting.

At the time of introduction, the FE 50-150mm F2.0 GM was the only wide-aperture f/2 full-frame zoom lens covering the range 50-150mm. Its only competitor was the Tamron 35-150mm f/2-2.8. The latter lens is less expensive and lighter, and has a wider zoom range. However, its maximum aperture is a slower f/2.8 over the range 40-150mm.

== Build quality ==
Focus controls on the barrel

The lens has an off-white weather resistant plastic and metal exterior with rubber focus and zoom rings. On the side of the lens are two external controls for changing focusing modes. It also features three external focus-hold buttons for locking in focus. With an internal zoom mechanism, the physical length of the lens does not change when zooming. The four focus motors support auto-focus at up to 120 fps, the maximum burst rate of the Sony α9 III, a high-end action camera.

Rear mounting flange and rear elements

The lens has a removable tripod foot. The lens is not compatible with Sony's 1.4x and 2.0x teleconvertors as the rear lens element is too close to the mounting flange.

== Image quality ==
The image quality is rated exceptionally sharp throughout its zoom range and from centre to corners of the frame. Slight softness is reported at 50mm and f/2. The 11-blade aperture gives smooth and pleasing bokeh. The MTF charts (a measure of the sharpness of a lens) show theoretical performance comparable to very good modern prime lenses at both 50mm and 150mm.

== See also ==
- List of Sony E-mount lenses
