= Sony FE 20mm F1.8 G =

Sony FE 20mm F1.8 G (SEL20F18G)
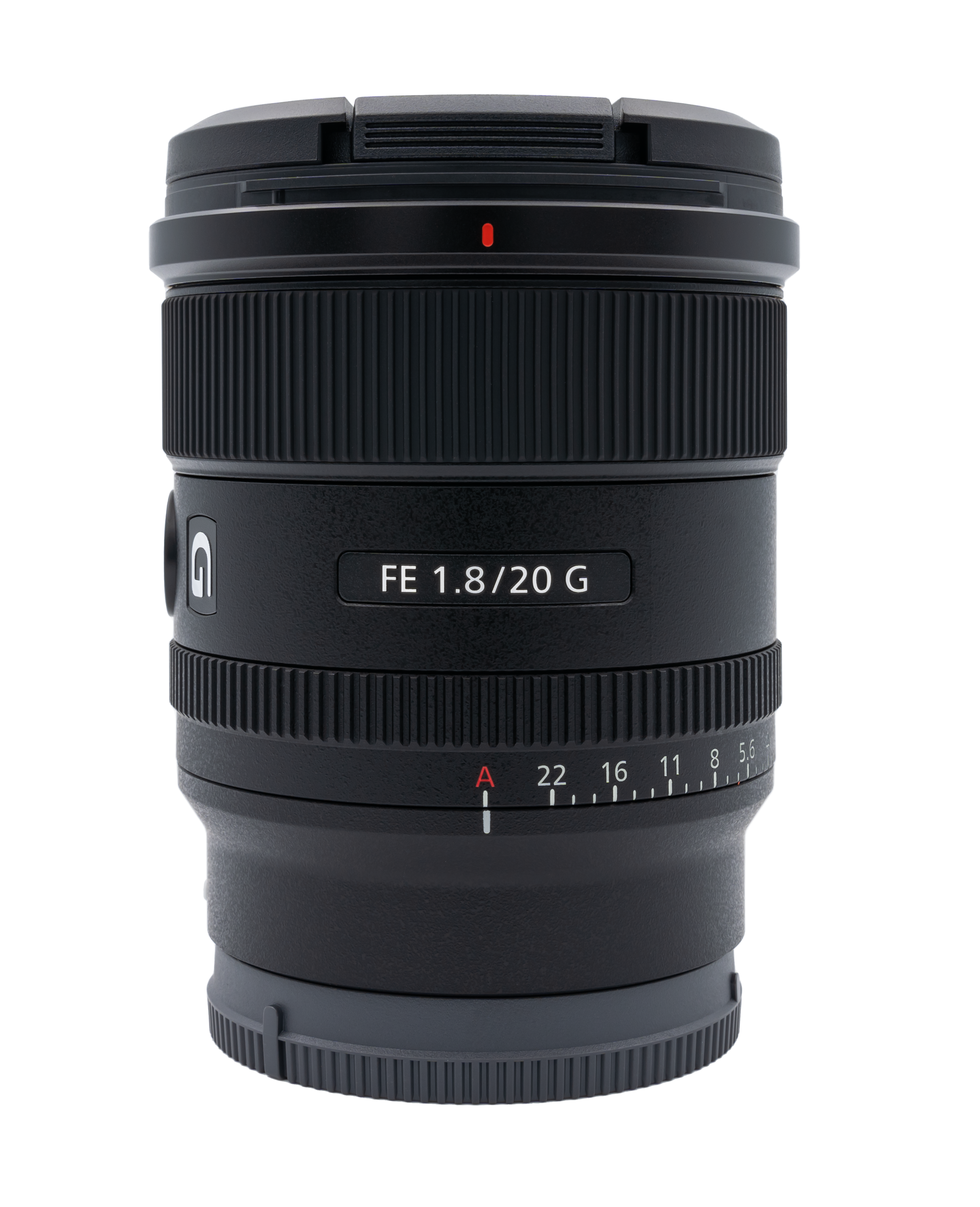
- Maker: Sony
- Lens mount(s): Sony E-mount

Technical data
- Type: prime lens
- Focus drive: Autofocus drive
- Focal length: 20mm
- Image format: 35mm full-frame
- Aperture (max/min): f/1.8-22
- Close focus distance: 0.18 metres (0.59 ft)
- Max. magnification: 0.22
- Diaphragm blades: 9
- Construction: 14 elements in 12 groups

Features
- Lens-based stabilization: No No
- Unique features: G-series lens
- Application: Landscape, Architecture

Physical
- Max. length: 84.7 millimetres (3.33 in)
- Diameter: 73.5 millimetres (2.89 in)
- Weight: 373 grams (0.822 lb)
- Filter diameter: 67mm

Accessories
- Lens hood: ALC-SH162 (blossom shape, bayonet)

Angle of view
- Horizontal: 94°

History
- Introduction: March 2020

The Sony FE 20mm F1.8 G is a full-frame wide-angle lens with Sony E-mount bayonet, released in March 2020.

== Features ==
The lens has two rings, one for manual focus and one for the aperture. The circular button holds the focus and the switch below allows a change between autofocus and manual focus. An aperture latching switch allows to switch between snapping in or smooth rotation of the aperture ring. The lens build allows an application of polarization filters. As it is a prime lens, the focal length cannot be changed. The lens has a dust and splash water-repellent design, but complete resistance to dust and splash water are not guaranteed. Two "extreme dynamic" (XD) linear motors realize a faster focusing on the motif. An AR nanocoating reduces unwanted light reflections and internal reflections while achieving higher contrast. Sagittal reflections are reduced by two advanced aspherical and three extra-low-dispersion glas elements. The body is made of metal and plastic.

== Scope of delivery ==
The lens comes with the ALC-SH162 as lens hood, and two lens caps (front: ALC-F67S, rear: ALC-R1EM). An included soft bag allows a better transportation.

== Image quality ==
The image quality is exceptionally high, even for Sony G lenses. The resolution is high from f/1.8 to f/8, while losing with smaller apertures. The sharpness loss towards the image borders is rather small, but can be bigger while using the open aperture. Chromatic aberrations, if present, can be found at the image borders. Those are however very small and barely visible on high-resolution images coming from Sony a7R IV or V. The occurring barrel distortion can be corrected by software.

== Awards ==
The lens is featured as best wide-angle lens 2020 by EISA.

== See also ==
- List of Sony E-mount lenses
