= List of Sony E-mount lenses =

Sony released the following SEL (for: Sony E-mount Lens) lenses for Sony E-mount cameras since 2010. They are also compatible with Hasselblad E-mount cameras. Some of the lenses introduced into the line have been developed in cooperation with Carl Zeiss (as indicated).

== APS-C lenses ==
=== APS-C zoom lenses ===
Focal Length	Aperture	intro	OSS	Type	PZ	Wgt	⌀	Length	Min Focus	Mag	Filter Size	Model	Notes
10–18mm	f/4	2012	Yes	No	No	225g	70mm	63.5mm	0.25m	0.1	62mm	SEL-1018	
10–20mm	f/4	2022	No	G	Yes	178g	69.8mm	55mm	0.13m	0.18	62mm	SEL-P1020G	
16–50mm	f/3.5–5.6	2013	Yes	No	Yes	116g	64.7mm	29.9mm	0.25(W); 0.3(T)	0.215	40.5mm	SEL-P1650	Power zoom, retractable design
16–50mm	f/3.5–5.6	2024	Yes	No	Yes	107g	66mm	31.3mm	0.25(W); 0.3(T)	0.215	40.5mm	SEL-P16502	
16–55mm	f/2.8	2019	No	G	No	494g	73mm	100mm	0.33m	0.2	67mm	SEL-1655G	
16–70mm	f/4	2013	Yes	Zeiss	No	308g	66.6mm	75mm	0.35m	0.23	55mm	SEL-1670Z	Vario-Tessar design with T* coating.
18–50mm	f/4–5.6	2014	No	No	No	116g	68.5mm	59mm	0.40m		55mm	SEL-1850	Discontinued in 2016. Sold only with Sony A3500.
18–55mm	f/3.5–5.6	2010	Yes	No	No	194g	62mm	60mm	0.25m	0.3	49mm	SEL-1855	Discontinued.
18–105mm	f/4	2013	Yes	G	Yes	427g	78mm	110mm	0.45m	0.11	72mm	SEL-P18105G	
18–110mm	f/4	2016	Yes	G	Yes	1105g	110mm	167.5mm	0.40m	0.122	95mm	SEL-P18110G	
18–135mm	f/3.5–5.6	2018	Yes	No	No	325g	67.2mm	88mm	0.45m	0.29	55mm	SEL-18135	
18–200mm	f/3.5–6.3	2010	Yes	No	No	524g	75.5mm	99mm	0.30m	0.35	67mm	SEL-18200	
18–200mm LE	f/3.5–6.3	2012	Yes	No	No	460g	68mm	97.1mm	0.50m	0.27	62mm	SEL-18200LE	Light Edition
18–200mm PZ	f/3.5–6.3	2012	Yes	No	Yes	649g	93.2mm	99mm	0.30m	0.35	67mm	SEL-P18200	
55–210mm	f/4.5–6.3	2011	Yes	No	No	345g	63.8mm	108mm	1.00m	0.225	49mm	SEL-55210	
70–350mm	f/4.5–6.3	2019	Yes	G	No	625g	77mm	142mm	1.10m	0.23	67mm	SEL-70350G	

=== APS-C prime lenses ===
Foc. Len.	Aperture	Intro	OSS	Type	Wgt	⌀	L	Min. Foc.	Mag	Filter Size	Model	Notes
11mm	f/1.8	2022	No	No	181g	66mm	57.5mm	0.15m (AF); 0.12m (MF)	0.13 (AF); 0.20 (MF)	55mm	SEL-11F18	
15mm	f/1.4	2022	No	G	219g	66.6mm	69.5mm	0.20m (AF)); 0.17m (MF)	0.12 (AF); 0.15 (MF)	55mm	SEL-15F14G	
16mm	f/2.8	2010	No	No	67g	62mm	22.5mm	0.24m	0.078	49mm	SEL-16F28S	
20mm	f/2.8	2013	No	No	69g	62.6mm	20.4mm	0.20m	0.12	49mm	SEL-20F28B	
24mm	f/1.8	2011	No	Zeiss	225g	63mm	65.5mm	0.16m	0.25	49mm	SEL-24F18Z	Sonnar design with T* coating.
30mm	f/3.5	2011	No	No	138g	62.0mm	55.5mm	0.095m	1.0	49mm	SEL-30M35	Macro lens.
35mm	f/1.8	2012	Yes	No	154g	63mm	45mm	0.30m	0.15	49mm	SEL-35F18	
50mm	f/1.8	2011	Yes	No	202g	62mm	62mm	0.39m	0.16	49mm	SEL-50F18	

== Full frame lenses ==
=== Full frame zoom lenses ===
Foc. Len.	Aperture	Intro	OSS	Type	PZ	Wgt	⌀	L	Min. Foc.	Mag	Filter Size	Model	Notes
8-14mm	f/3.5	2026-09	No	G	No	314g	63.1mm	82.8mm	0.15m	0.22	—N/a	SEL-814G	Fisheye
12–24mm	f/2.8	2020	No	G Master	No	847g	97.6mm	137mm	0.28m	0.14	—N/a	SEL-1224GM	
12–24mm	f/4	2017	No	G	No	565g	87mm	117mm	0.28m	0.14	—N/a	SEL-1224G	
16–25mm	f/2.8	2024	No	G	No	409g	74.8mm	91.4mm	0.18m (W,AF); 0.24m (T,AF); 0.17m (W,MF); 0.22m (T,MF)	0.20 (AF); 0.23 (MF)	67mm	SEL-1625G	
16–35mm	f/2.8	2017	No	G Master	No	680g	88.5mm	121.6mm	0.28m	0.19	82mm	SEL-1635GM	
16–35mm	f/2.8	2023	No	G Master	No	547g	87.8mm	111.5mm	0.22m	0.32	82mm	SEL-1635GM2	
16–35mm	f/4	2022	No	G	Yes	353g	80.5mm	88.1mm	0.24m	0.23	72mm	SEL-P1635G	
16–35mm	f/4	2014	Yes	Zeiss	No	518g	78mm	98.5mm	0.28m	0.19	72mm	SEL-1635Z	Vario-Tessar design with T* coating.
16–35mm	T3.1	2019	No	G	Yes	1390g	118.4mm	190mm	0.28m	0.19	N/A	SELC1635G	Cine lens. Detachable servo zoom available.
20–70mm	f/4	2023	No	G	No	488g	78.7mm	99mm	0.25m	0.39	72mm	SEL2070G	
24–50mm	f/2.8	2024	No	G	No	440g	74.8mm	92.3mm	0.18m	0.33	67mm	SEL-2450G	
24–70mm	f/4	2014	Yes	Zeiss	No	426g	73mm	94.5mm	0.40m	0.2	67mm	SEL-2470Z	Vario-Tessar design with T* coating.
24–70mm	f/2.8	2016	No	G Master	No	886g	87.6mm	136mm	0.38m	0.24	82mm	SEL-2470GM	
24–70mm	f/2.8	2022	No	G Master	No	695g	87.8mm	120mm	0.21m	0.32	82mm	SEL-2470GM2	
24–105mm	f/4	2017	Yes	G	No	663g	83.4mm	113.3mm	0.38m	0.31	77mm	SEL-24105G	
24–240mm	f/3.5–6.3	2015	Yes	—N/a	No	780g	80.5mm	119mm	0.50m	0.27	72mm	SEL-24240	
28–60mm	f/4–5.6	2020	No	—N/a	No	167g	66.6mm	45mm	0.30m	0.16	40.5mm	SEL-2860	
28–70mm	f/2	2024	No	G Master	No	918g	92.9mm	139.8mm	0.38m	0.23	86mm	SEL-2870GM	
28–70mm	f/3.5–5.6	2025	Yes	—N/a	No	293g	72.5mm	83mm	0.3-0.45m	0.19	55mm	SEL-28702	120 fps AF/AE tracking support
28–70mm	f/3.5–5.6	2013	Yes	—N/a	No	295g	72.5mm	83mm	0.30m	0.19	55mm	SEL-2870	
28–135mm	f/4	2014	Yes	G	Yes	1215g	105mm	162.5mm	0.40m	0.15	95mm	SEL-P28135G	
50–150mm	f/2	2025	No	G Master	No	1340g	102.8mm	200mm	0.40m (W); 0.74m (T)	0.2	95mm	SEL50150GM	Internal zoom
70–200mm	f/4	2014	Yes	G	No	840g	80mm	175mm	1.00–1.50m (AF); 1.00–1.35m (MF)	0.13	72mm	SEL-70200G	Internal zoom
70–200mm	f/4	2023	Yes	G	No	794g	82.2mm	149.0mm	0.26–0.42m	0.5	72mm	SEL-70200G2	Macro lens
70–200mm	f/2.8	2016	Yes	G Master	No	1480g	88mm	205.3mm	0.96m	0.25	77mm	SEL-70200GM	Internal zoom
70–200mm	f/2.8	2021	Yes	G Master	No	1045g	88mm	200mm	0.40–0.82m	0.3	77mm	SEL-70200GM2	Internal zoom
70–300mm	f/4.5–5.6	2016	Yes	G	No	854g	84mm	143.5mm	0.90m	0.31	72mm	SEL-70300G	
100–400mm	f/4.5	2026	Yes	G Master	No	1840g	119.8mm	328mm	0.64m (W); 1.5m (T)	0.25	95mm 40.5mm	SEL-100400MC	Internal zoom
100–400mm	f/4.5–5.6	2017	Yes	G Master	No	1398g	93.9mm	205mm	0.98m	0.35	77mm	SEL-100400GM	
100–400mm	f/5.6–8	2026	Yes	—N/a	No	654g	78.2mm	164.5mm	1.13m (W); 0.86m (T)	0.41	67mm	SEL-100400	IF
200–600mm	f/5.6–6.3	2019	Yes	G	No	2115g	111.5mm	318mm	2.40m	0.2	95mm	SEL-200600G	Internal zoom
400–800mm	f/6.3–8	2025-02	Yes	G	No	2475g	119.8mm	346mm	1.70m (W); 3.50m (T)	0.23	105mm	SEL-400800G	Internal zoom

=== Full frame prime lenses ===
Foc. Len.	Aperture	Intro	OSS	Type	Wgt	⌀	L	Min. Foc.	Mag	Filter Size	Model	Notes
14mm	f/1.8	2021	No	G Master	460g	83mm	99.8mm	0.25m	0.10	N/A	SEL-14F18GM	Uses gel filters behind the rear element.
16mm	f/1.8	2025	No	G	304g	73.8mm	75mm	0.15m (AF); 0.13m (MF)	0.25 (AF); 0.30 (MF)	67mm	SEL-16F18G	
20mm	f/1.8	2020	No	G	373g	73.5mm	84.7mm	0.18m	0.22	67mm	SEL-20F18G	
24mm	f/1.4	2018	No	G Master	445g	75.4mm	92.4mm	0.24m	0.17	67mm	SEL-24F14GM	
24mm	f/2.8	2021	No	G	162g	68mm	45mm	0.18m	0.19	49mm	SEL-24F28G	
28mm	f/2	2015	No	No	200g	60mm	64mm	0.25m	0.16	49mm	SEL-28F20	
35mm	f/1.4	2021	No	G Master	524g	76mm	96mm	0.25m	0.26	67mm	SEL-35F14GM	
35mm	f/1.4	2015	No	Zeiss	630g	78.5mm	112mm	0.30m	0.18	72mm	SEL-35F14Z	Distagon design with T* coating.
35mm	f/2.8	2013	No	Zeiss	120g	61.5mm	36.5mm	0.35m	0.12	49mm	SEL-35F28Z	Sonnar design with T* coating.
35mm	f/1.8	2019	No	No	280g	65.6mm	73mm	0.22m	0.24	55mm	SEL-35F18F	
40mm	f/2.5	2021	No	G	173g	68mm	45mm	0.25m	0.23	49mm	SEL-40F25G	
50mm	f/1.2	2021	No	G Master	778g	87mm	109.2mm	0.40m	0.17	72mm	SEL-50F12GM	
50mm	f/1.4	2023	No	G Master	516g	80.6mm	96mm	0.41m (AF); 0.38m (MF)	0.16 (AF); 0.18 (MF)	67mm	SEL-50F14GM	
50mm	f/1.4	2016	No	Zeiss	778g	83.5mm	108mm	0.45m	0.15	72mm	SEL-50F14Z	Planar design with T* coating.
50mm	f/1.8	2016	No	No	186g	68.6mm	59.5mm	0.45m	0.14	49mm	SEL-50F18F	
50mm	f/2.5	2021	No	G	174g	68mm	45mm	0.31m	0.21	49mm	SEL-50F25G	
50mm	f/2.8	2016	No	No	236g	70.8mm	71mm	0.16m	1.00	55mm	SEL-50M28	Macro lens
55mm	f/1.8	2013	No	Zeiss	281g	64.4mm	71mm	0.50m	0.14	49mm	SEL-55F18Z	Sonnar design with T* coating.
85mm	f/1.4	2024	No	G Master	642g	84.7mm	107.3mm	0.85m (AF); 0.80m (MF)	0.11 (AF); 0.12 (MF)	77mm	SEL-85F14GM2	
85mm	f/1.4	2016	No	G Master	848g	89.5mm	107.5mm	0.85m (AF); 0.80m (MF)	0.12	77mm	SEL-85F14GM	
85mm	f/1.8	2017	No	No	371g	78mm	82mm	0.80m	0.13	67mm	SEL-85F18	
90mm	f/2.8	2015	Yes	G	602g	79mm	130.5mm	0.28m	1.00	62mm	SEL-90M28G	Macro lens.
100mm	f/2.8	2025	Yes	G Master	646g	81.4mm	147.9mm	0.26m	1.4	67mm	SEL-100M28GM	Macro lens
100mm	f/2.8	2017	Yes	G Master	700g	85.2mm	118.1mm	0.57m	0.25	72mm	SEL-100F28GM	Smooth Trans Focus.
135mm	f/1.8	2019	No	G Master	953g	89.5mm	127mm	0.70m	0.25	82mm	SEL-135F18GM	
300mm	f/2.8	2023	Yes	G Master	1470g	124mm	265mm	2m	0.16	40.5mm	SEL-300F28GM	
400mm	f/2.8	2018	Yes	G Master	2895g	158.1mm	359mm	2.70m	0.16	40.5mm	SEL-400F28GM	
400mm	f/4.5	2026-09	Yes	G Master	994g	108mm	242mm	2.5m	0.18	95mm	SEL-400F45GM	
600mm	f/4	2019	Yes	G Master	3040g	163.6mm	449mm	4.50m	0.14	40.5mm	SEL-600F40GM	
600mm	f/6.3	2026-09	Yes	G Master	995g	108mm	263mm	2.5m	0.25	95mm	SEL-600F63GM	

== Lens accessories ==
Name	intro	Type	Format	Weight	Model	Comments
Sony Fisheye Converter 0.62x	2010	Front converter	APS-C	150g	VCL-ECF1 VCL-ECF2	Second version in 2015.
Sony Ultra Wide Converter 0.75x	2010	Front converter	APS-C	125g	VCL-ECU1 VCL-ECU2	Second version in 2015.
Sony Fisheye Converter 0.57x	2015	Front converter	35mm	418g	SEL-057FEC	
Sony Ultra Wide Converter 0.75x	2015	Front converter	35mm	267g	SEL-075UWC	
Sony Tele Converter 1.4x	2016	Rear converter	35mm	167g	SEL-14TC	
Sony Tele Converter 2x	2016	Rear converter	35mm	207g	SEL-20TC	
Sony Lens Adapter E/A 1	2010	Mount adapter	APS-C	110g	LA-EA1	for A-mount lenses on E-mount camera, glass-less, CD-AF / OS-PD-AF with SSM/SAM lenses only.
Sony Lens Adapter E/A 2	2011	Mount adapter	APS-C	200g	LA-EA2	for A-mount lenses on E-mount camera, SLT-PD-AF with all AF lenses.
Sony Lens Adapter E/A 3	2013	Mount adapter	35mm	110g	LA-EA3	for A-mount lenses on full-frame E-mount camera, glass-less, CD-AF / OS-PD-AF with SSM/SAM lenses only.
Sony Lens Adapter E/A 4	2013	Mount adapter	35mm	160g	LA-EA4	for A-mount lenses on full-frame E-mount camera, SLT-PD-AF with all AF lenses.
Sony Lens Adapter E/A 5	2020	Mount adapter	35mm	88g	LA-EA5	only compatible with certain camera/lens combinations, uses camera's on-sensor PD/CD AF (no mirror).
Sony Lens Adapter E/B 1	2019	Mount adapter	S16mm	430g	LA-EB1	only compatible with certain camera

== Lens designations ==
Sony E lens designations
Tag	Meaning	Description
E	Standard E-mount	Series for the APS-C and Super-35mm image format
ECU	E-mount Converter Ultra-wide	Ultra-wide converter for specific lenses
ECF	E-mount Converter Fisheye	Fisheye converter for specific lenses
FE	Full-frame E-mount	Series for 35mm full-frame image format
G	Gold	Lineup of high-grade lenses
GM	Gold Master	Lineup of ultra high-grade lenses
II	2nd Gen	Second generation or version of that specific lens
LA-EA	Lens Adapter - E-mount to A-mount	Adapter for E-mount camera body to use α-mount lenses
LA-EB	Lens Adapter - E-mount to B4-mount	Adapter for E-mount camera body to use B4-mount lenses
LE	Light Edition	Lens designed to be particularly light
Macro	Macro	Macro lens with 1:1 magnification
OSS	Optical SteadyShot	Lens with optical image stabilization
PZ	Power Zoom	Lens with motor zoom facility
SEL	Sony E-mount Lens	Lens for E-mount cameras
TC	Tele Converter	Teleconverter for increasing the effective focal length of a lens
T*	T coating	Zeiss special T* coating; only on a Sony Zeiss lens
XD	Extreme Dynamic	Linear autofocus motors built for speed, tracking, and silent operation
ZA	Zeiss α	Zeiss lens for Sony α cameras; designed and manufactured by Sony in Japan, once the designs get approval by Carl Zeiss AG to meet their quality standards.

== See also ==
- List of third-party E-mount lenses
- List of Minolta A-mount lenses
- Zeiss Planar
- Zeiss Sonnar
- Zeiss Distagon
- Zeiss Vario-Tessar
