= Sony FE 28mm F2 =

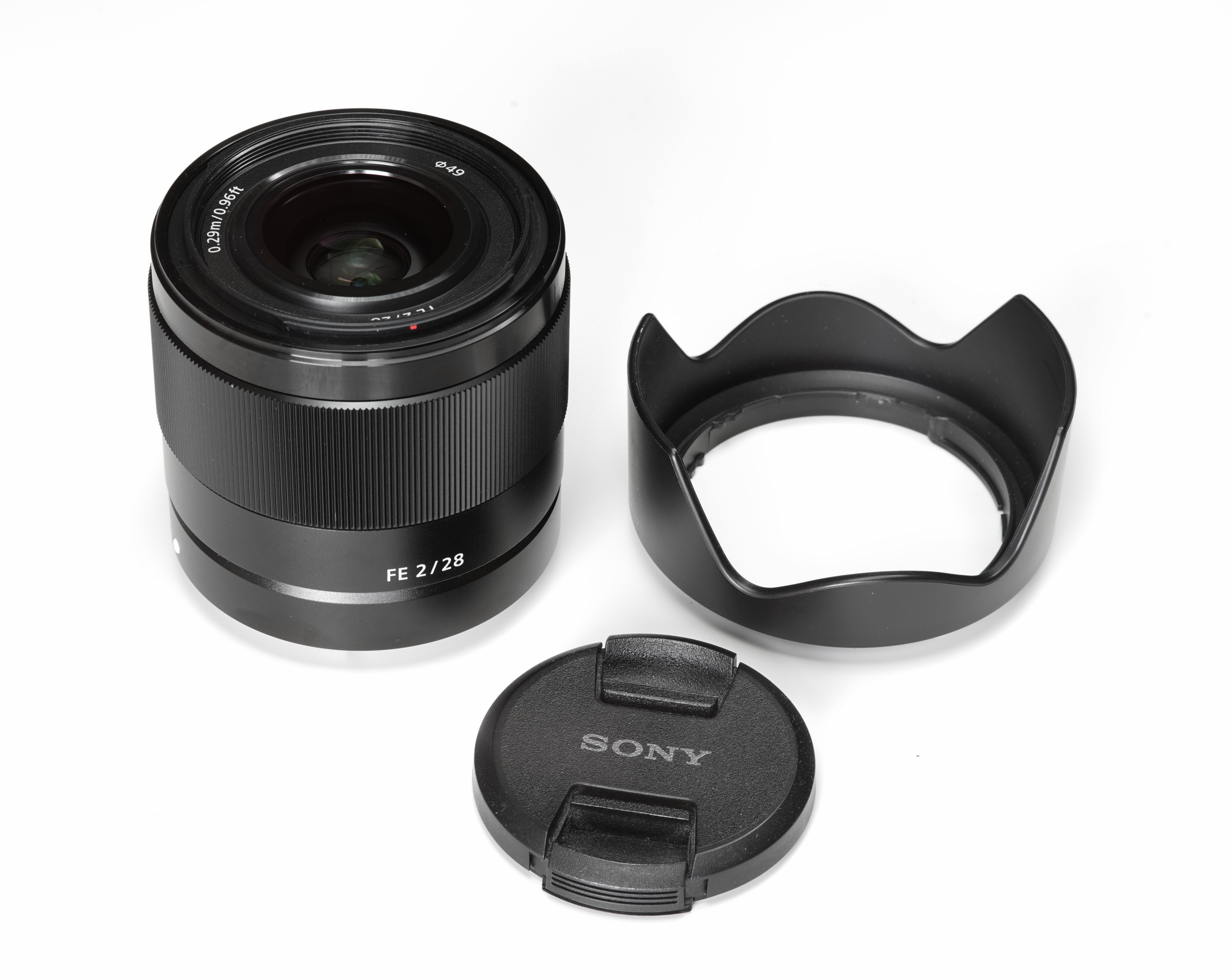
- The lens (left) shown here with lens hood (right) and lens cap (bottom).
- Maker: Sony
- Lens mount(s): Sony E-mount

Technical data
- Type: Prime
- Focus drive: Stepper motor
- Focal length: 28mm
- Image format: 35mm full-frame
- Aperture (max/min): f/2.0-22.0
- Close focus distance: 0.29 metres (0.95 ft)
- Max. magnification: 0.13x
- Diaphragm blades: 9
- Construction: 9 elements in 8 groups

Features
- Manual focus override: Yes Yes
- Weather-sealing: Yes Yes
- Lens-based stabilization: No No
- Aperture ring: No No
- Application: Landscape, architecture, low light

Physical
- Max. length: 60 millimetres (2.4 in)
- Diameter: 64 millimetres (2.5 in)
- Weight: 200 grams (0.44 lb)
- Filter diameter: 49mm

Accessories
- Lens hood: ALC-SH112

History
- Introduction: 2015

Retail info
- MSRP: $424 USD

The Sony FE 28mm F2 is a full-frame (FE) wide-angle lens for the Sony E-mount, announced by Sony on March 4, 2015.

Though designed for Sony's full frame E-mount cameras, the lens can be used on Sony's APS-C E-mount camera bodies, with an equivalent full-frame field-of-view of 42mm.

== Build Quality ==
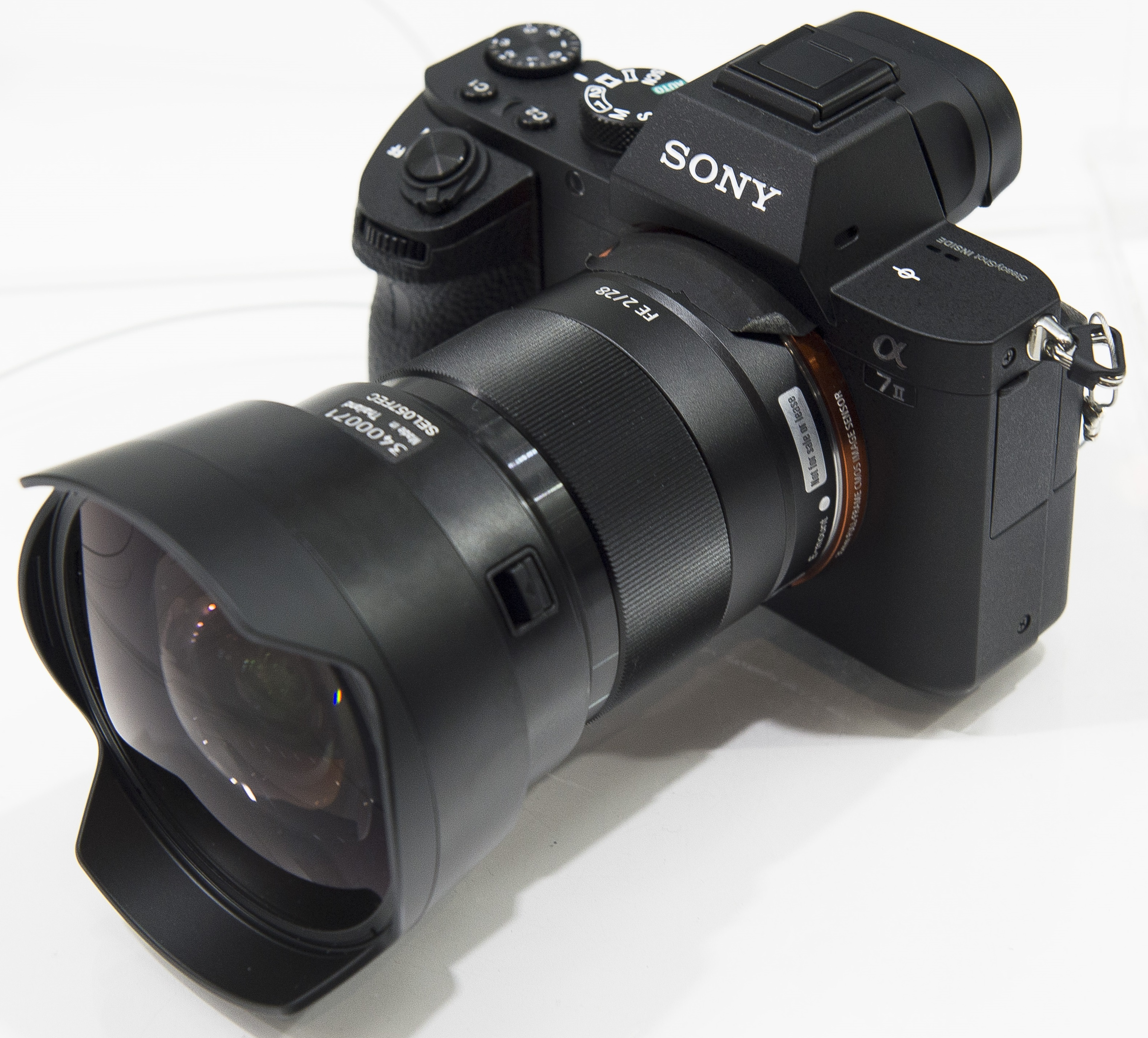
Sony α7 II with the FE 28mm F2 and 16mm fisheye converter attached.

The lens features a minimalist alloy exterior with a singular focusing ring and a detachable plastic petal-type lens hood. The lens is weather resistant. The lens has nine elements in eight groups with two ED extra-low dispersion elements for the reduction of chromatic aberration and three aspherical elements. Its diaphragm has 9 rounded blades for smooth bokeh. The diagonal view is 75° on full frame e-mount cameras and 54° on APS-C e-mount cameras. Its filter threads and internals are plastic. The focus ring and the rear barrel is metal. It is made in Thailand.

Sony manufactured two lens converters made exclusively for the FE 28mm lens: a 21mm F2.8 ultra-wide angle and a 16mm F2.8 fisheye. Both lens converters contain magnets that are sensed by the lens to transmit corrected Exif data to the camera body when a photo is taken. However, neither converter can accept lens filters or are themselves weather resistant.

== Image Quality ==
The lens is sharp straight from its maximum aperture of f/2.0, with only a mildly apparent fall-off in acuity toward the edge of the frame. The lens also excels at low-light photography given its fast maximum aperture of f/2.0 and exceptional coma control. In addition, having a wide-angle field-of view allows for longer exposures to be taken of stars without the effect of star trails affecting the resultant image.

The lens suffers from moderate barrel lens distortion and moderate vignetting when at f/2.0 (which can be resolved by stopping down to f/2.8). When shooting RAW the strong barrel distortion has to be corrected by software.

== See also ==
- List of Sony E-mount lenses
