= Sony E PZ 18-105mm F4 G OSS =

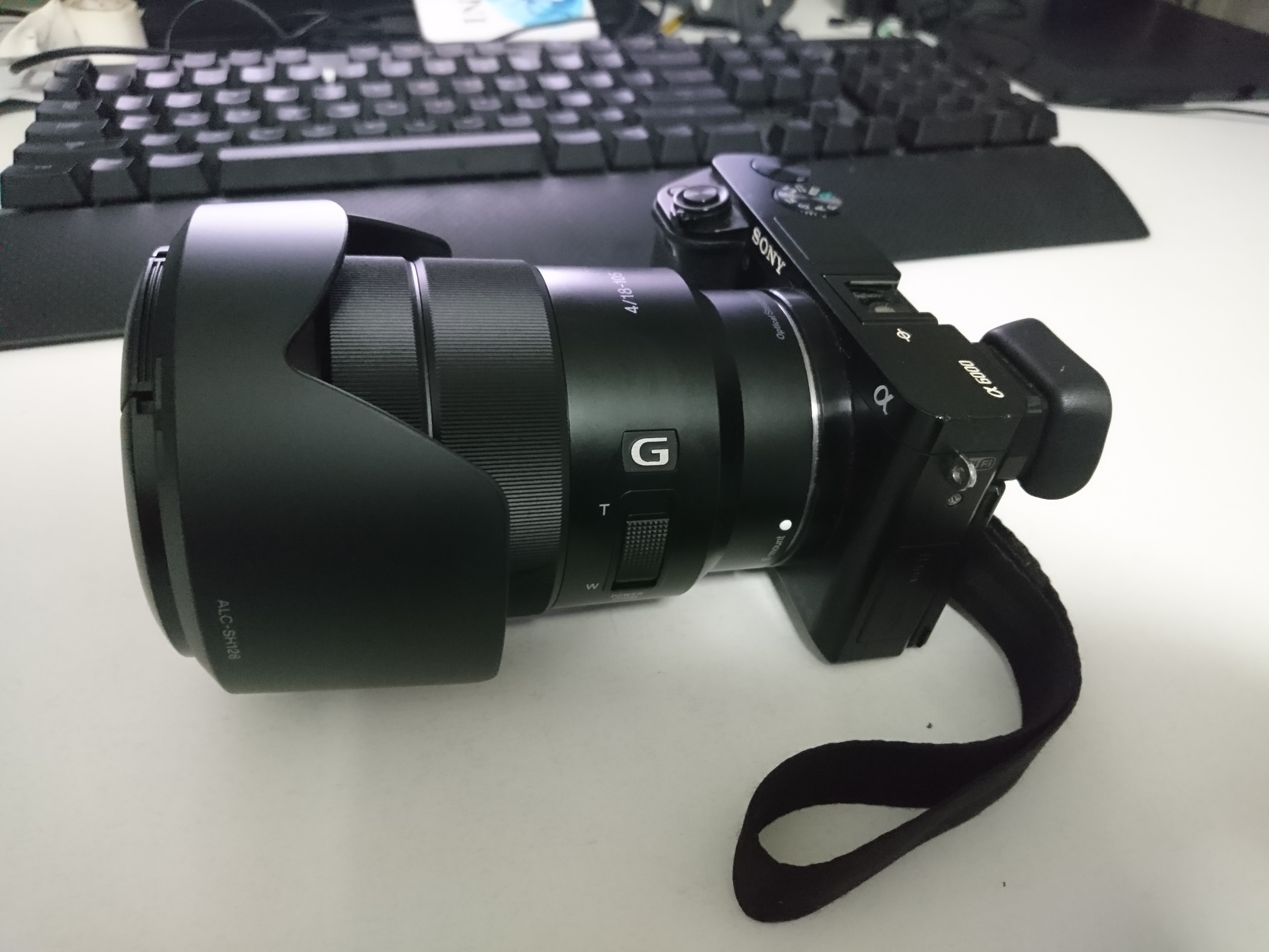
- Sony 18-105mm lens with its reversible petal-style lens hood attached to a Sony α6000
- Maker: Sony
- Lens mount(s): Sony E-mount

Technical data
- Type: Zoom
- Focus drive: Micromotor Autofocus
- Focal length: 18-105mm
- Focal length (35mm equiv.): 27-157.5mm
- Image format: APS-C
- Aperture (max/min): f/4.0
- Close focus distance: 0.45 metres (1.5 ft) - 0.95 metres (3.1 ft)
- Max. magnification: 0.11x
- Diaphragm blades: 7
- Construction: 16 elements in 12 groups

Features
- Manual focus override: Yes Yes
- Weather-sealing: No No
- Lens-based stabilization: Yes Yes
- Aperture ring: No No
- Unique features: G-series lens, Power Zoom
- Application: Multipurpose

Physical
- Max. length: 110.0 millimetres (4.33 in)
- Diameter: 78.0 millimetres (3.07 in)
- Weight: 427 grams (0.941 lb)
- Filter diameter: 72mm

Accessories
- Lens hood: Petal-type

History
- Introduction: 2013

Retail info
- MSRP: $598 USD

The Sony E 18-105mm F4 OSS is a fixed maximum aperture zoom lens for the Sony E-mount, released by Sony on August 27, 2013.

The 18-105mm F4.0 G lens is least expensive G-series lens Sony makes. It is popular among professionals and hobbyists who want G-lens quality and a wide zoom range without spending thousands of dollars.

== Build quality ==
The 18-105mm features a minimalist metal exterior reminiscent of Sony's Zeiss lenses. The 18-105mm lens features a wide electronic zoom ring encircling the lens barrel, as well as a much narrower electronic focusing ring. A two-speed power-zoom rocker can be found on the side of the lens. There is no zoom lock to prevent zoom creep due to the zoom mechanism being inside the lens barrel itself.

== Image quality ==
The lens is consistently sharp throughout its zoom range, softening up only at the extreme corners of the image. Vignetting is noticeable at F4, but stopping down generally resolves this issue. Strong pin-cushion distortion, though largely corrected in-lens, is apparent throughout the frame when shooting in RAW. Chromatic aberration, restricted to the corners, but occurring at all apertures, is mildly apparent from 18-24mm and at 105mm.

== See also ==
- List of Sony E-mount lenses
- Sony E 16-70mm F4 ZA
