= Sony FE PZ 28-135mm F4 G OSS =

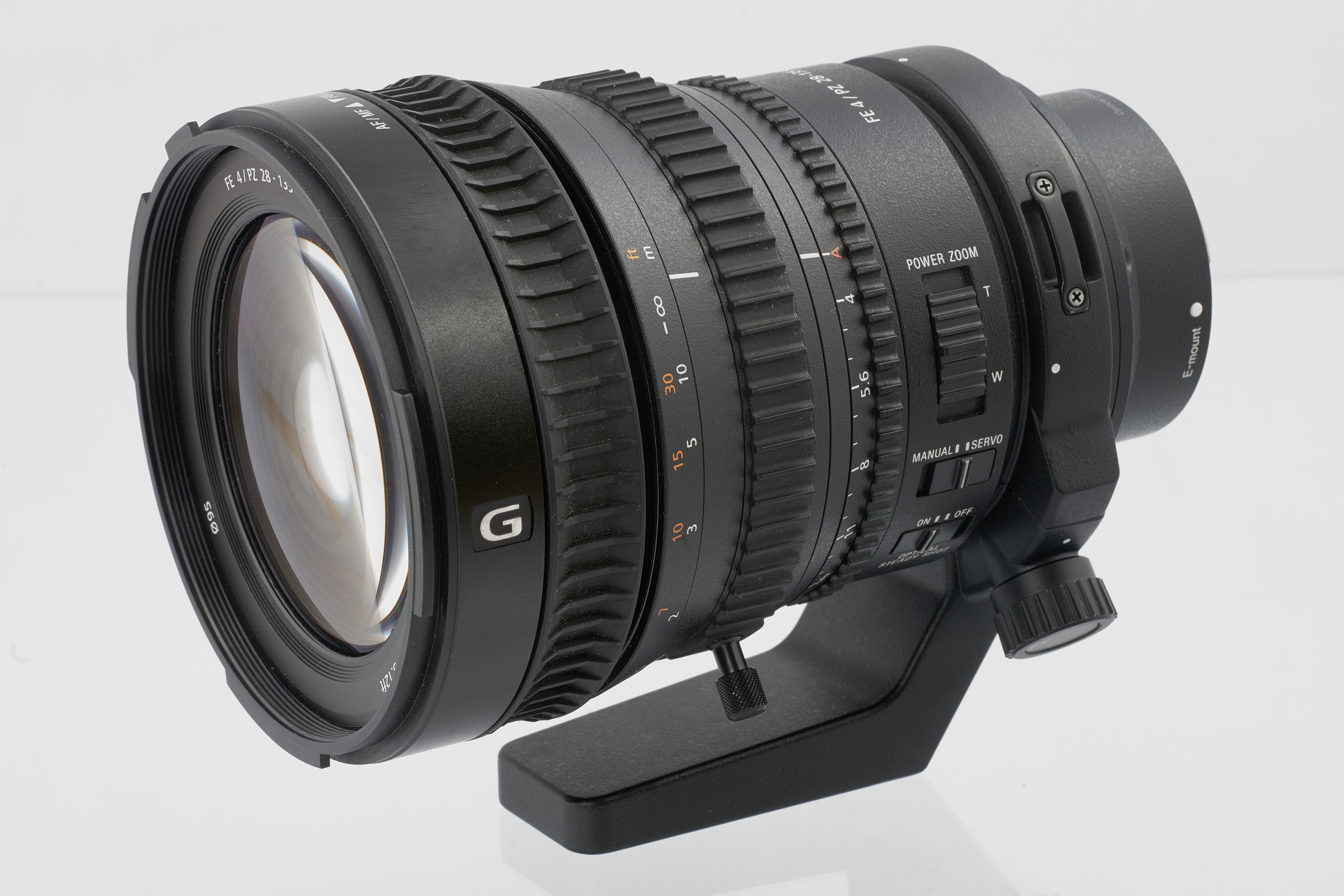
- Maker: Sony
- Lens mount(s): Sony E-mount

Technical data
- Type: Zoom
- Focus drive: Stepper motor
- Focal length: 28-135mm
- Image format: 35mm full-frame
- Aperture (max/min): f/4.0
- Close focus distance: 0.40 metres (1.3 ft)
- Max. magnification: 0.15
- Diaphragm blades: 9
- Construction: 18 elements in 12 groups

Features
- Manual focus override: Yes Yes
- Weather-sealing: Yes Yes
- Lens-based stabilization: Yes Yes
- Aperture ring: Yes Yes
- Unique features: G-series
- Application: Multipurpose

Physical
- Diameter: 105 millimetres (4.1 in)
- Weight: 1,215 grams (2.679 lb)
- Filter diameter: 95mm

Accessories
- Lens hood: ALC-SH135

History
- Introduction: 2014

Retail info
- MSRP: $2399 USD

The Sony FE PZ 28-135mm F4 G OSS is a full-frame constant maximum aperture advanced standard zoom lens for the Sony E-mount, announced by Sony on September 12, 2014.

Though designed for Sony's full frame E-mount cameras, the lens can be used on Sony's APS-C E-mount camera bodies, with an equivalent full-frame field-of-view of 42-202.5mm.

== See also ==
- List of Sony E-mount lenses
