= Sony E 18-55mm F3.5-5.6 OSS =

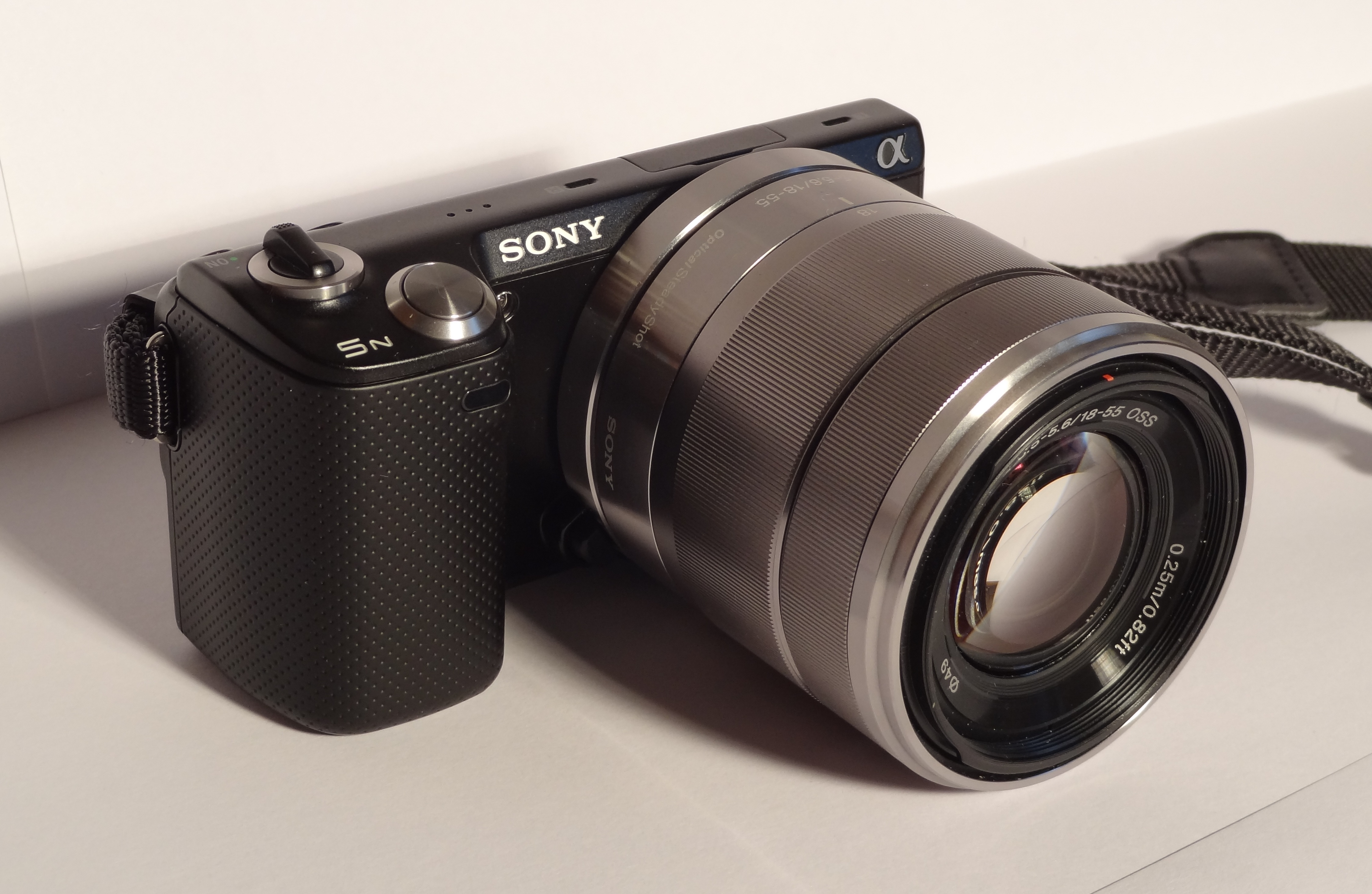
- Sony NEX-5N with the 18-55mm lens
- Maker: Sony
- Lens mount: Sony E-mount

Technical data
- Type: Zoom
- Focus drive: Stepper motor
- Focal length: 18-55mm
- Focal length (35mm equiv.): 27-82.5mm
- Image format: APS-C
- Aperture (max/min): f/3.5-5.6
- Close focus distance: 0.24 metres (0.79 ft)
- Max. magnification: 0.31x
- Diaphragm blades: 7
- Construction: 11 elements in 9 groups

Features
- Manual focus override: Yes Yes
- Weather-sealing: No No
- Lens-based stabilization: Yes Yes
- Aperture ring: No No
- Application: Multipurpose

Physical
- Max. length: 60 millimetres (2.4 in)
- Diameter: 62 millimetres (2.4 in)
- Weight: 214 grams (0.472 lb)
- Filter diameter: 49mm

History
- Introduction: 2010

Retail info
- MSRP: $299 USD

The Sony E 18-55mm F3.5-5.6 OSS is a variable maximum aperture standard zoom lens for the Sony E-mount, announced by Sony on May 11, 2010. The lens is often bundled with various Sony α mirrorless cameras as a "kit lens".

== Construction ==
The lens barrel is made of magnesium alloy, and the zoom ring will scratch after some weeks of regular use.

== Optical properties ==
The lens has significant distortion at 18mm and 35mm, but less so at other focal lengths. Similarly, lateral chromatic aberration is particularly noticeable at these focal lengths, and increases as the lens is stopped down. While center sharpness is high at all focal lengths, there is strong fall-off towards the edges and corners, particularly at 18mm. Neither edge nor center performance improve much at other focal lengths. Coma is well-corrected, but "when it comes to flares, the Sony E 18–55 f/3.5–5.6 OSS fails spectacularly", according to reviewer Symon Starczewski of LensTip.com. Optical stabilization gives a benefit of two stops.

== See also ==
- Sony E PZ 16-50mm F3.5-5.6 OSS
- Sony E 18-50mm F4-5.6
- List of Sony E-mount lenses
- List of standard zoom lenses
