= Sony FE 16-35mm F2.8 GM =

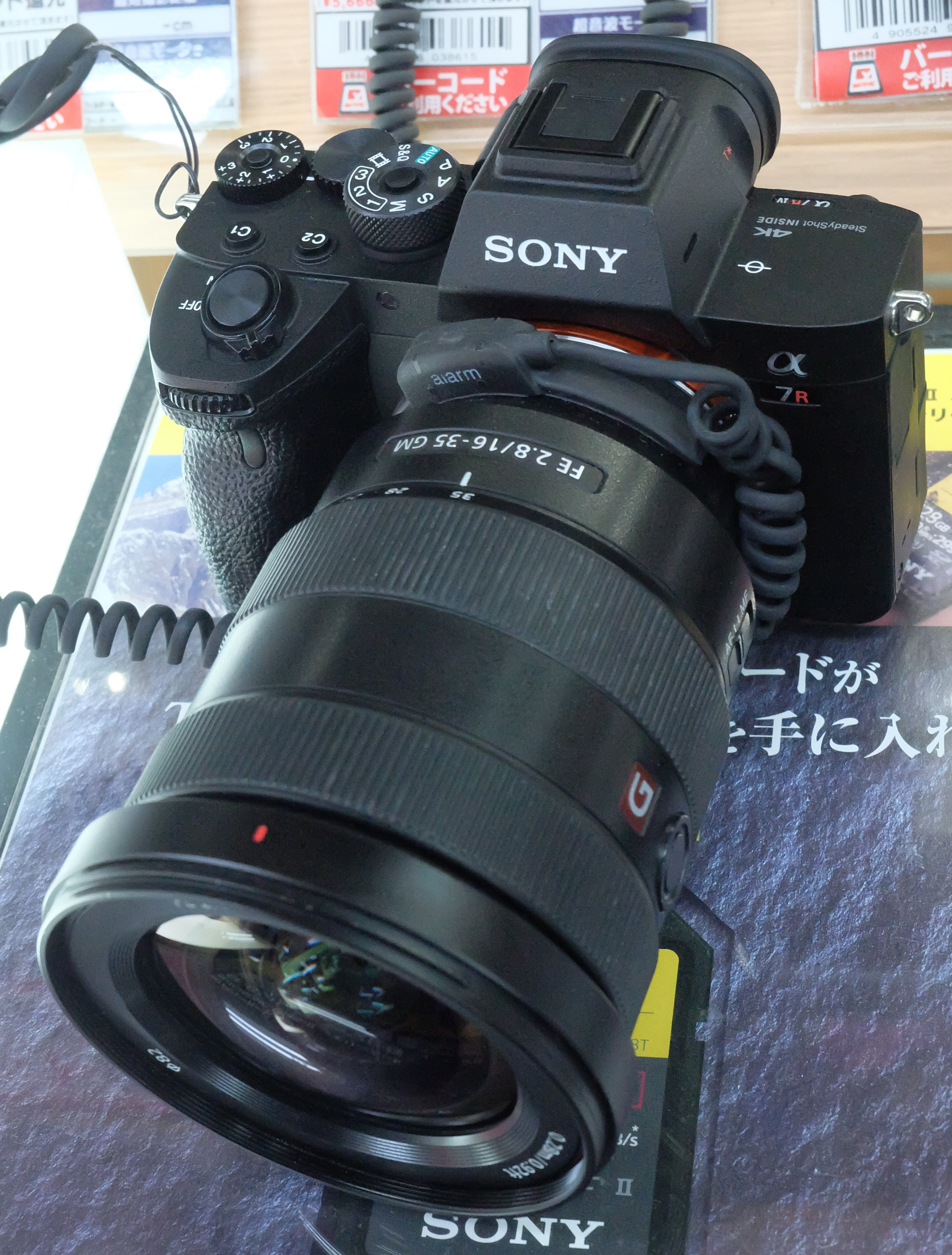
- Lens mounted on a Sony A7R IV
- Maker: Sony
- Lens mount: Sony E-mount

Technical data
- Type: Zoom
- Focal length: 16-35mm
- Image format: 35mm full-frame
- Aperture (max/min): f/2.8-22.0
- Close focus distance: 0.28 metres (0.92 ft)
- Max. magnification: 1:5 (0.19x)
- Diaphragm blades: 11
- Construction: 16 elements in 13 groups

Features
- Manual focus override: Yes Yes
- Weather-sealing: Yes Yes
- Lens-based stabilization: No No
- Aperture ring: No No
- Unique features: GM-series lens
- Application: Landscape, Architectural

Physical
- Max. length: 122 millimetres (4.8 in)
- Diameter: 89 millimetres (3.5 in)
- Weight: 680 grams (1.50 lb)
- Filter diameter: 82mm

Accessories
- Lens hood: Petal-shape

History
- Introduction: 2017
- Successor: Sony FE 16-35mm F2.8 GM II

Retail info
- MSRP: $2199 USD

The Sony FE 16-35mm F2.8 GM is a premium constant maximum aperture wide-angle full-frame (FE) zoom lens for the Sony E-mount, announced by Sony on May 17, 2017. The lens is scheduled for release on August 31, 2017.

This lens is part of Sony's professional GM zoom lens of the FE 12-24mm F2.8, FE 16-35mm F2.8, FE 24-70mm F2.8, and FE 70-200mm F2.8. Though designed for Sony's full frame E-mount cameras, the lens can be used on Sony's APS-C E-mount camera bodies, with an equivalent full-frame field-of-view of 24–52.5mm.

== Build quality ==
The lens showcases a weather resistant matte-black plastic exterior with a pair of rubber focus and zoom rings. The barrel of the lens telescopes outward from the main lens body as it's zoomed in from 16mm to 35mm. The lens does not feature image stabilization.

== See also ==
- List of Sony E-mount lenses
- Sony FE 16-35mm F4 ZA OSS
