= Sony Zeiss Vario-Tessar T* FE 16-35mm F4 ZA OSS =

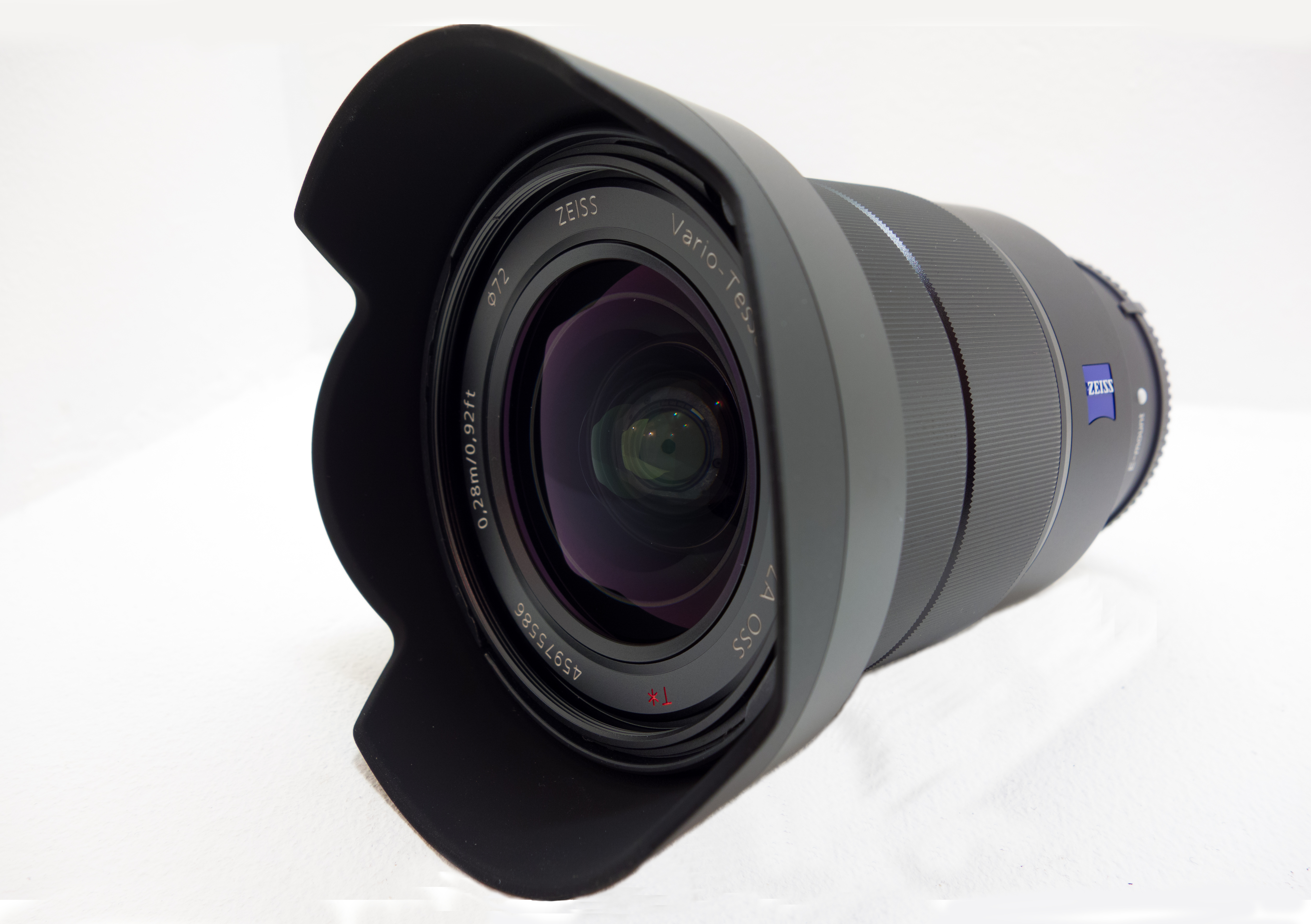
- Maker: Sony
- Lens mount(s): Sony E-mount

Technical data
- Type: Zoom
- Focal length: 16-35mm
- Image format: 35mm full-frame
- Aperture (max/min): f/4.0
- Close focus distance: 0.28 metres (0.92 ft)
- Max. magnification: 1:5 (0.19x)
- Diaphragm blades: 7
- Construction: 12 elements in 10 groups

Features
- Manual focus override: Yes Yes
- Weather-sealing: Yes Yes
- Lens-based stabilization: Yes Yes
- Aperture ring: No No
- Unique features: Carl Zeiss approved
- Application: Landscape, Architectural

Physical
- Max. length: 98.5 millimetres (3.88 in)
- Diameter: 78 millimetres (3.1 in)
- Weight: 518 grams (1.142 lb)
- Filter diameter: 72mm

Accessories
- Lens hood: Petal-shape

History
- Introduction: 2014

Retail info
- MSRP: $1249 USD

The Sony Zeiss Vario-Tessar T* FE 16-35mm F4 ZA OSS is a constant maximum aperture wide-angle full-frame (FE) zoom lens for the Sony E-mount, announced by Sony on September 15, 2014.

Though designed for Sony's full frame E-mount cameras, the lens can be used on Sony's APS-C E-mount camera bodies, with an equivalent full-frame field-of-view of 24–52.5mm.

== Build quality ==
The lens has a weather resistant solid all-metal finish with a pair of metal focus and zoom rings. The barrel of the lens telescopes outward from the main lens body as it's zoomed in from 16mm to 35mm.

== See also ==
- List of Sony E-mount lenses
- Sony FE 16-35mm F2.8 GM
- Sony FE 12-24mm F4 G
- Zeiss Vario-Tessar
