= Sony FE 28-70mm F3.5-5.6 OSS =

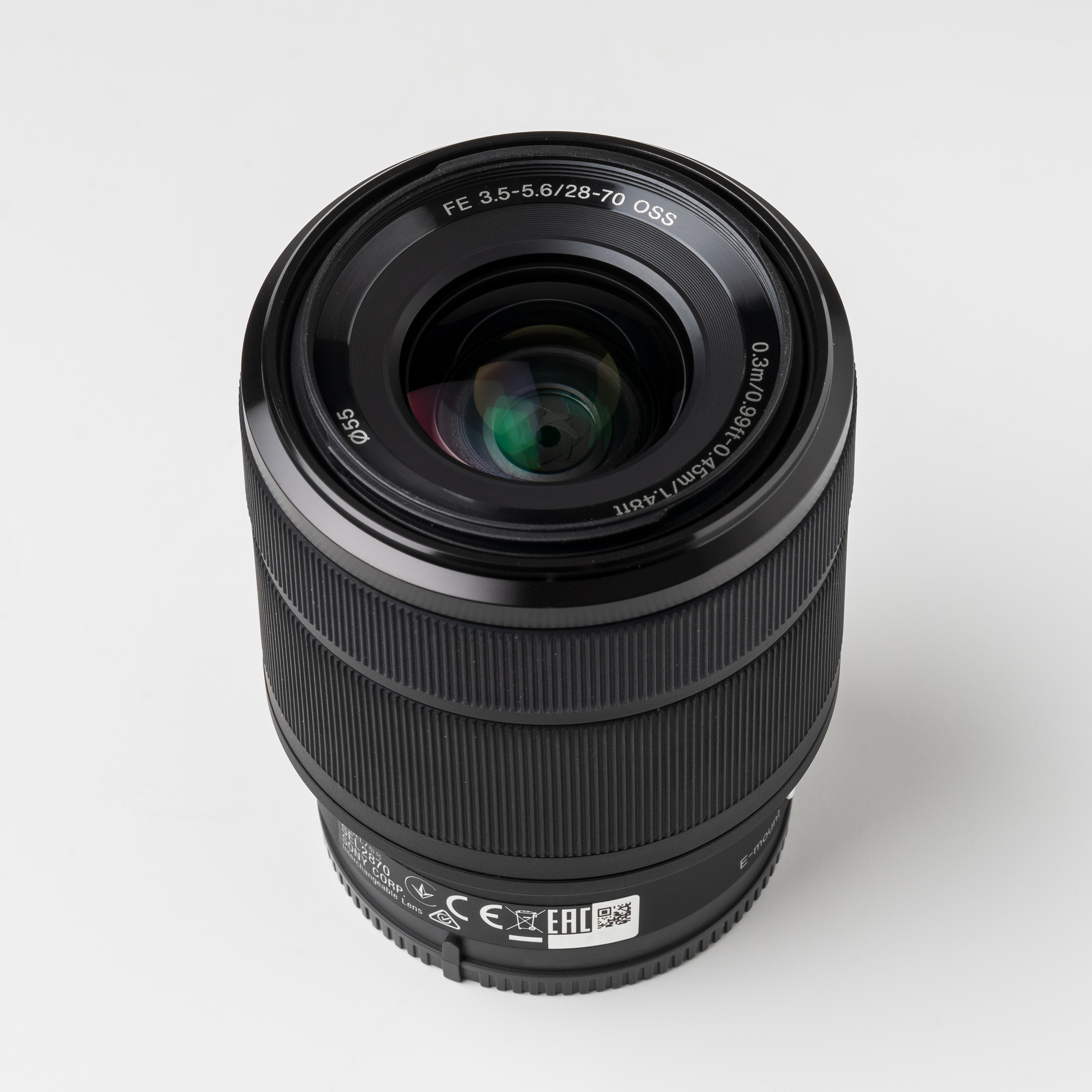
- Maker: Sony
- Lens mount(s): Sony E-mount

Technical data
- Type: Zoom
- Focus drive: Stepper motor
- Focal length: 28-70mm
- Image format: 35mm full-frame
- Aperture (max/min): f/3.5 (22.0) - 5.6 (36.0)
- Close focus distance: 0.40 metres (1.3 ft)
- Max. magnification: 0.20x
- Diaphragm blades: 7
- Construction: 9 elements in 8 groups

Features
- Manual focus override: Yes Yes
- Weather-sealing: Yes Yes
- Lens-based stabilization: Yes Yes
- Aperture ring: No No
- Application: Multipurpose

Physical
- Max. length: 95.0 millimetres (3.74 in)
- Diameter: 73.0 millimetres (2.87 in)
- Weight: 426 grams (0.939 lb)
- Filter diameter: 55mm

Accessories
- Lens hood: Petal-shape

History
- Introduction: 2013

Retail info
- MSRP: $499 USD

The Sony FE 28-70mm F3.5-5.6 OSS is a full-frame (FE) variable maximum aperture standard zoom lens for Sony E-mount, announced by Sony on October 16, 2013. It was the first kit lens for Sony's full-frame E-mount (FE) system, and was released on the same day as the Sony α7 and Sony α7R. It is often bundled with various Sony E-mount full-frame mirrorless cameras, and is a less costly alternative to other standard zooms such as the Sony Carl Zeiss Vario-Tessar T* FE 24-70mm F4 ZA OSS.

Though designed for Sony's full frame E-mount cameras, the lens can be used on Sony's APS-C E-mount camera bodies, with an equivalent full-frame field-of-view of 42-105mm.

== Construction ==
The lens has a weather resistant plastic construction with a matte-black finish and rubber zoom and focus rings. The barrel of the lens moves outward from the main lens body as it's zoomed in from 28mm to 70mm.

== Optical properties ==
The Sony FE 28-70mm F3.5-5.6 OSS shows acceptable chromatic aberration and good bokeh. Corner sharpness becomes “acceptable” when the lens is stopped down to f/8. Natively, it suffers from fairly noticeable distortion - 2.5% barrel distortion at 28mm, 3.2% pincushion at 50mm and 3.7% pincushion at 70mm, and requires correction in-camera or in raw processing.

Its optical performance is competitive with the Sony Carl Zeiss Vario-Tessar T* FE 24-70mm F4 ZA OSS in every metric tested by DxOMark.

== Autofocus ==
The lens focuses internally, using a linear autofocus motor. Its autofocus is “silent and accurate” and “very quick”.

== See also ==
- List of Sony E-mount lenses
- List of standard zoom lenses
