= Zoom creep =

Phenomenon in zoom lenses

Zoom creep is a phenomenon in zoom lenses where the angle of view of the lens changes when gravity is allowed to freely act on it. If the lens has a zoom ring, holding it when the lens is held upwards or downwards will prevent this change. In lenses with push-pull zoom, creep is prevented by holding the extending part of the lens. Some lenses, such as the Tamron SP AF 17-50mm f/2.8 XR Di II LD Aspherical [IF] and Canon EF-S 18-135mm f/3.5-5.6 IS STM, have a zoom lock to stop the effect.
