= Content Credentials =

Digital media metadata specification for provenance and authenticity

C2PA Manifest Store
- Filename extension: .c2pa
- Internet media type: application/c2pa
- Developed by: Coalition for Content Provenance and Authenticity (C2PA)
- Initial release: December 21, 2021; 4 years ago
- Latest release: 2.5; October 9, 2026; 42 days ago
- Type of format: Digital media provenance and asset history
- Container for: JSON; JSON-LD; XMP; JPEG universal metadata box format (JUMBF); CBOR; COSE digital signatures; X.509 certificates; Cryptographic Message Syntax (CMS); Brotli-compressed manifests (brob); ML-DSA post-quantum signatures
- Contained by: JPEG (APP11); JPEG XL (jumb); PNG (caBX); GIF (Application Extension); SVG (Base64-encoded metadata); TIFF / DNG / Exif; RIFF (WAV, AVI, WebP); BMFF (MP4, MOV, HEIF, AVIF); PDF; ZIP-based formats (EPUB, OOXML, ODF, OpenXPS); HTML (<script> / <link>); Plain and structured text (Markdown, JSONL, WebVTT, RSS, Atom); TTML; ID3 audio (MP3, FLAC); Ogg Vorbis; Standard MIDI Files; OpenType / Open Font Format (C2PA table); WARC web archives; Apache Parquet; ONNX & SafeTensors ML models; BlockFact (.facti, .facta, .factv)
- Open format?: Yes
- Website: contentcredentials.org

Content Credentials are cryptographically signed metadata structures, known as C2PA manifests, that provide a verifiable record of a digital asset's provenance and modification history. Defined by the C2PA specifications, this architecture establishes a core set of technical assertions, while supporting custom schemas to extend metadata regarding authorship, content intent, and machine-readable usage preferences.

The core C2PA specification is authored and maintained by the Coalition for Content Provenance and Authenticity (C2PA), an industry group composed of major technology firms and media companies. It operates as a project of the Joint Development Foundation (JDF), an affiliate of the Linux Foundation.

A supplementary specification addressing identity, publishing, licensing, and schema-based assertions is defined in the Creators Assertions Working Group (CAWG) specification. This specification is overseen by the Decentralized Identity Foundation (DIF) and maintained by Adobe.

Parallel promotional initiatives, including sponsored brand campaigns in media outlets, educational outreach, and legislative adoption efforts, are led by the Content Authenticity Initiative (CAI), a cross-sector coalition established by Adobe.

== Distinction between provenance and factual accuracy ==
Adobe's marketing of Content Credentials as a digital "nutrition label" is a false equivalence as such labels catalog objective chemical composition while Content Credentials merely verify provenance and digital integrity without assessing the objective truth of the content itself. Consequently, a fabricated or misleading image can maintain a valid cryptographic credential that confirms its origin while validating deceptive content as technically authentic.

== C2PA Conformance Program ==
In early-to-mid 2024, the C2PA established the Conformance Task Force to transition its open technical specifications into a verifiable compliance model to foster market trust. The task force utilized the Trust over IP (ToIP) Governance Metamodel to structure its compliance policies.

The C2PA Conformance Program soft-launched on June 4, 2025, at the Content Authenticity Initiative (CAI) Summit, followed by a full public launch in October 2025. The transition concluded on December 31, 2025, when the C2PA Interim Trust List was officially deprecated.

In October 2026, security researcher David Buchanan demonstrated a vulnerability in the C2PA specification that allows an attacker to alter an image without invalidating its cryptographic signatures or trusted timestamps. By exploiting a feature that permits arbitrary byte range "exclusions," a signer can exclude an entire file from signature calculations. This generates a valid timestamp over an empty string, allowing the image to be tampered with after the fact without triggering current C2PA verification tools. Buchanan noted that a complete fix is complex due to format-specific requirements, suggesting that verifiers must strictly enforce constraints on allowed exclusion ranges.

=== Conforming Implementations ===
While the C2PA Conformance Explorer registry indexes over 200 active products, ecosystem data indicates that 10 organizations have deployed products that simultaneously complete the Conformance Program and achieve on-boarding onto the central C2PA Trust List.

Organization / Company	Deployed Conforming Product(s)	C2PA Version
OpenAI	ChatGPT / GPT images	2.4
Google LLC	Gemini, Pixel Camera, Google Photos	2.2
Guardian Project	Proofmode Capture App	2.2
Vivo Mobile Communication	Vivo / JOVI Camera/Albums App	2.2
VBrick Systems, Inc.	VBrick Video Platform	2.2
Encypher Corporation	Encypher Mark	2.2
National Public Broadcasting Company of Ukraine	Suspilne Media	2.2
Austrian Parliament	Austrian Parliament Mediathek	2.2
Stability AI	Brand Studio, Stable Audio and Developer Platform API	2.2
Cloudinary Ltd.	Cloudinary	2.2

== Ecosystem and adoption ==
Content Credentials architecture spans four distinct components of the digital media lifecycle that handle the creation, transit, presentation, and verification of digital assets.

=== Media Providers ===
Hardware devices (e.g., cameras with hardware security module), editing software, and generative artificial intelligence (AI) platforms acting as C2PA claim generators. Providers ingest metadata such as timestamps or editing history.

==== Generative AI Platforms ====
Service	Developer	Implementation	AI Disclosure	C2PA Conformance Program	Trust Lists
Adobe Firefly	Adobe Inc.	2023-03	no	no	C2PA Interim Trust List
Respeecher	Respeecher	2023-07	No	No	No
Microsoft Designer	Microsoft Corporation	2023-09	No	No	C2PA Interim Trust List
Stability AI Brand Studio, Stable Audio, Platform API	Stability AI Ltd.	2023-11	No	2.2	C2PA Trust List
DALL-E / ChatGPT	OpenAI	2024-02	No	2.4	C2PA Trust List
Microsoft Azure	Microsoft Corporation	2024-02	no	no	C2PA Interim Trust List
Runway	Runway AI, Inc.	2024-06	no	2.2	No
ElevenLabs	ElevenLabs Inc.	2024-07	no	no	C2PA Interim Trust List (Expire 2026-10-06)
Flux API	Black Forest Labs	2024-09	Model Name	No	No
Amazon Titan Image Generator	Amazon.com, Inc.	2024-09	No	2.2	C2PA Interim Trust List (Expire 2026-12-06)
Bria AI	Bria Artificial Intelligence Ltd.	2025-01	No	No	C2PA Interim Trust List
Dreamina	ByteDance Ltd.	2025-04	No	No	No
Google Gemini	Google LLC	2025-08	No	2.2	C2PA Trust List
Grok Imagine	SpaceXAI LLC	2026-04	No	No	No
Seedance / Seedream	ByteDance Ltd.	2026-04	No	No	No
Higgsfield AI	Higgsfield, Inc.	2026-07	No	No	No
Pixelcut	Pixelcut Inc.	2026-08	No	No	No
Suno	Suno, Inc.	2026-08	No	No	No
Topaz Labs	Adobe Inc.	2026-08	No	No	No
fal	Features & Labels Inc.	2026-08	No	No	No
Claude	Anthropic	2026-09	No	No	No
Recraft	Recraft	2026-09	No	No	No
Creatify	Creatify Lab Inc.	2026-09	No	No	No
Ideogram	Ideogram, Inc.	2026-09	No	No	No
Kling AI	Kuaishou Technology	2026-11	No	No	No

==== Cameras ====
Despite high-profile camera announcements, a significant structural rift exists within the current C2PA landscape. As of mid-2026, major dedicated camera manufacturers (Leica, Nikon, and Canon) do not participate in the official C2PA Conformance Program. And while their signatures can be valid within their own ecosystem or legacy C2PA versions (Adobe software, Sony Ci Media Cloud, Canon Authenticity Imaging System ), they may not be trusted by any conformant platform.

As of 2026, no dedicated camera implementations had achieved compliance under the C2PA Conformance Program.

Manufacturer	Model	C2PA Implementation Date	C2PA Conformance Program	Certificates
Sony	Sony α1	2024-03-28	no	Sony Trust List The free C2PA certificates provided by Sony can be used to sign any asset and cannot be used on their own to prove an image was taken by a Sony camera. To establish origin and proof of capture, an image must contain both a valid Sony C2PA certificate and Sony's proprietary authenticity signature, a combination that can only be validated on Sony Ci Media Cloud.
Sony	Sony α7S III	2024-03-28	no	Sony Trust List The free C2PA certificates provided by Sony can be used to sign any asset and cannot be used on their own to prove an image was taken by a Sony camera. To establish origin and proof of capture, an image must contain both a valid Sony C2PA certificate and Sony's proprietary authenticity signature, a combination that can only be validated on Sony Ci Media Cloud.
Sony	Sony α1 II	2025-01-15	no	Sony Trust List The free C2PA certificates provided by Sony can be used to sign any asset and cannot be used on their own to prove an image was taken by a Sony camera. To establish origin and proof of capture, an image must contain both a valid Sony C2PA certificate and Sony's proprietary authenticity signature, a combination that can only be validated on Sony Ci Media Cloud.
Sony	Sony α9 III	2025-01-15	no	Sony Trust List The free C2PA certificates provided by Sony can be used to sign any asset and cannot be used on their own to prove an image was taken by a Sony camera. To establish origin and proof of capture, an image must contain both a valid Sony C2PA certificate and Sony's proprietary authenticity signature, a combination that can only be validated on Sony Ci Media Cloud.
Sony	Sony α7 IV	2025-03-04	no	Sony Trust List The free C2PA certificates provided by Sony can be used to sign any asset and cannot be used on their own to prove an image was taken by a Sony camera. To establish origin and proof of capture, an image must contain both a valid Sony C2PA certificate and Sony's proprietary authenticity signature, a combination that can only be validated on Sony Ci Media Cloud.
Sony	PXW-Z300	2025-07-22	no	Sony Trust List The free C2PA certificates provided by Sony can be used to sign any asset and cannot be used on their own to prove an image was taken by a Sony camera. To establish origin and proof of capture, an image must contain both a valid Sony C2PA certificate and Sony's proprietary authenticity signature, a combination that can only be validated on Sony Ci Media Cloud.
Sony	Sony FX3	2025-10-30	no	Sony Trust List The free C2PA certificates provided by Sony can be used to sign any asset and cannot be used on their own to prove an image was taken by a Sony camera. To establish origin and proof of capture, an image must contain both a valid Sony C2PA certificate and Sony's proprietary authenticity signature, a combination that can only be validated on Sony Ci Media Cloud.
Sony	Sony FX30	2025-10-30	no	Sony Trust List The free C2PA certificates provided by Sony can be used to sign any asset and cannot be used on their own to prove an image was taken by a Sony camera. To establish origin and proof of capture, an image must contain both a valid Sony C2PA certificate and Sony's proprietary authenticity signature, a combination that can only be validated on Sony Ci Media Cloud.
Sony	Sony α7R V	2025-11-26	no	Sony Trust List The free C2PA certificates provided by Sony can be used to sign any asset and cannot be used on their own to prove an image was taken by a Sony camera. To establish origin and proof of capture, an image must contain both a valid Sony C2PA certificate and Sony's proprietary authenticity signature, a combination that can only be validated on Sony Ci Media Cloud.
Sony	Sony α7 V	2026-05-14	no	Sony Trust List The free C2PA certificates provided by Sony can be used to sign any asset and cannot be used on their own to prove an image was taken by a Sony camera. To establish origin and proof of capture, an image must contain both a valid Sony C2PA certificate and Sony's proprietary authenticity signature, a combination that can only be validated on Sony Ci Media Cloud.
Sony	Sony α7R VI	2026-06-04	no	Sony Trust List The free C2PA certificates provided by Sony can be used to sign any asset and cannot be used on their own to prove an image was taken by a Sony camera. To establish origin and proof of capture, an image must contain both a valid Sony C2PA certificate and Sony's proprietary authenticity signature, a combination that can only be validated on Sony Ci Media Cloud.
Leica Camera	Leica M11-P	2023-10-26	no	C2PA Interim Trust List
Leica Camera	Leica M11-D	2024-09-12	no	C2PA Interim Trust List
Leica Camera	Leica SL3-S	2025-01-16	no	C2PA Interim Trust List
Leica Camera	Leica M EV1	2025-10-23	no	C2PA Interim Trust List
Leica Camera	Leica Q3 Monochrom	2025-11-20	no	C2PA Interim Trust List
Leica Camera	Leica SL3-P	2026-06-25	no	C2PA Interim Trust List
Canon Inc.	Canon EOS R1	2025-07-17	no	Canon Trust List
Canon Inc.	Canon EOS R5 Mark II	2025-07-17	no	Canon Trust List

Nikon announced in August 2025 a firmware update for the Z6III that enabled embedding Content Credentials directly into its photos. But only a few days later, a vulnerability was discovered in the software of the camera that allowed a user to combine unauthentic images with authentic photos and still have the resulting image with a valid digital signature. Nikon suspended its authenticity service and revoked the certificates.

==== Mobile apps with Camera Support ====
Application	Developer	C2PA Implementation	License	Requirements	C2PA Conformance Program	Trust Lists
Proofmode Capture	Guardian Project	2023-08	GNU General Public License	Android 10 or higher with Play Integrity API; iOS	2.2	C2PA Trust List
Pixel Camera	Google LLC	2025-09	Proprietary	Google Pixel 10 or higher series	2.2	C2PA Trust List
Vivo / JOVI Camera	Vivo Mobile Communication Co., Ltd.,	2025-10	Proprietary	vivo X300 and X500 series	2.2	C2PA Trust List
VWFNDR™ + MBL	Nuevo.Studio LLC	2026-05	Proprietary	Android 10 or higher with Play Integrity API; iOS	2.4	No

In August 2026, security researcher David Buchanan demonstrated that the C2PA implementation on Android is vulnerable to forgery. Using software exploit, an attacker can gain root access. While the raw cryptographic keys remain secure inside the hardware module, root access allows an attacker to command the system to sign arbitrary data, generating fabricated images with valid authenticity signatures. Google recognized the vulnerability but designated the report as "Won't fix (infeasible)", stating that a true mitigation would require an impractical re-architecture of the operating system software stack.

==== Mobile apps ====
Application	Developer	C2PA Implementation	License	Requirements	C2PA Conformance Program	Certificates
Photo Assist	Samsung corporation	2025-01	Proprietary	Galaxy S23 or higher	No	C2PA Interim Trust List
Google Photos	Google LLC	2025-09	Proprietary	Google Pixel 10 or higher: generate and validate iOS: validate	2.2	C2PA Trust List
Pixel Recorder	Google LLC	2025-11	Proprietary	Google Pixel 10 or higher	2.2	C2PA Trust List

==== Desktop Application software ====
As of mid-2026, no desktop application had achieved compliance under the C2PA Conformance Program.

Application	Developer	C2PA Implementation	License	C2PA Conformance Program	Trust Lists
Adobe Photoshop	Adobe Inc.	2020-10	Proprietary	No	C2PA Interim Trust List
Adobe Stock	Adobe Inc.	2022-10	Proprietary	No	C2PA Interim Trust List
Adobe Express	Adobe Inc.	2023-07	Proprietary	No	C2PA Interim Trust List
Adobe Illustrator	Adobe Inc.	2023-11	Proprietary	No	C2PA Interim Trust List
Adobe Substance 3D Modeler	Adobe Inc.	2024-03	Proprietary	No	C2PA Interim Trust List
Adobe InDesign	Adobe Inc.	2024-04	Proprietary	No	C2PA Interim Trust List
Adobe Lightroom	Adobe Inc.	2024-05	Proprietary	No	C2PA Interim Trust List
Adobe Camera Raw	Adobe Inc.	2024-05	Proprietary	No	C2PA Interim Trust List
Microsoft Paint	Microsoft Corporation	2024-06	Proprietary	No	No
Wacom Yuify	Wacom Co., Ltd.	2024-06	Proprietary	No	No
Adobe Bridge	Adobe Inc.	2024-10	Proprietary	No	C2PA Interim Trust List
Adobe Content Authenticity Apply	Adobe Inc.	2024-10	Proprietary	No	C2PA Interim Trust List
Capture One	Capture One A/S	2024-10	Proprietary	No	C2PA Interim Trust List (Expire 2027-05-23)
Adobe Premiere	Adobe Inc.	2025-04	Proprietary	No	C2PA Interim Trust List
Adobe Media Encoder	Adobe Inc.	2025-04	Proprietary	No	C2PA Interim Trust List
Adobe Fresco	Adobe Inc.	2025-05	Proprietary	No	C2PA Interim Trust List
SpyderPro	Datacolor, Inc.	2025-11	Proprietary	No	C2PA Interim Trust List (Expired 2026-08-31)
Canva	Canva, Inc.	2025-11	Proprietary	No	No

==== Media organizations ====
The integration of C2PA Content Credentials within journalistic workflows has faced adoption delays, which industry analysts attribute to limited coordination between technology developers and newsrooms, while unvetted implementations risk creating opaque verification processes for the public. Furthermore, the inclusion of persistent operational data has been cited as a potential security risk for confidential sources,.

On March 4, 2024, BBC Verify launched a transparency tool based on Content Credentials to verify the provenance of its news media. Open-source intelligence (OSINT) analysts subsequently demonstrated that a featured news video concerning gang violence in Haiti was a composite containing a recycled, fabricated audio track of gunfire dubbed over the footage. Over a 48-hour period, the BBC silently modified and republished three separate iterations of the video while removing prior C2PA manifest data. On March 28, 2024, the broadcaster issued a formal correction acknowledging the misleading audio and muted the affected passage. Following the incident, the feature's broad deployment was halted and reframed as a pilot initiative.

Service	Developer	Implementation	C2PA Conformance Program	Certificates
Defense Visual Information Distribution Service	U.S. Department of Defense	2024-08	No	DVIDS Trust List
JT certifiés	France Televisions SA	2025-09	No	C2PA Interim Trust List (Expire 2027-12-25)
Suspilne Media	Public Broadcasting Company of Ukraine	2026-07	2.2	C2PA Trust List
Austrian Parliament Mediathek	Austrian Parliament	2026-09	2.2	C2PA Trust List

=== Media Infrastructure ===
Content Delivery Networks, cloud storage repositories, digital asset management alongside Advertising networks and IP cameras networks systems that preserve the cryptographic manifest during transit. Because standard web routing and optimization tools frequently strip metadata or re-compress files to save bandwidth, these infrastructure layers are configured to pass the C2PA container through transit.

Service	Developer	Implementation	C2PA Conformance Program	Trust Lists
Pixelstream	Pixelstream, Inc.	2022-09	2.2	C2PA Interim Trust List (Expired 2026-05-06)
Adobe CX Enterprise: Adobe Experience Manager; Adobe Commerce; Adobe Advertising Cloud; GenStudio for Performance Marketing; Adobe Journey Optimizer B2B Ultimate; Adobe Journey Optimizer B2B Prime; Adobe Marketo Engage; Adobe Campaign; Adobe Journey Optimizer B2C; Adobe Workfront; CX Enterprise Coworker Campaigns	Adobe Inc.	2024-04	No	C2PA Interim Trust List
Cloudinary	Cloudinary Ltd.	2024-07	2.2	C2PA Trust List
Google Ads	Google LLC	2024-09	No	No
Cloudflare	Cloudflare, Inc.	2025-02	No	No
Fastly	Fastly, Inc.	2025-08	No	C2PA Interim Trust List (Expire 2035-05-07)
Ring	Ring Cameras	2025-12	2.2	No
VBrick Video Platform	VBrick Systems, Inc.	2026-02	2.2	C2PA Trust List
Encypher Mark	Encypher Corporation	2026-05	2.2	C2PA Trust List
Fotoware	Fotoware AS	2026-09	2.2	C2PA Interim Trust List (Expire 2027-12-21)
Jetpack Site Accelerator	Automattic Inc.	2026-09	No	No
Zoom (Cloud Recordings)	Zoom Communications, Inc.	2026-10	No	No

=== Publishing Platforms ===
Consumer-facing websites, publishers, and social media networks that host and distribute media. These platforms parse the C2PA manifest to generate an ingredient history tree and render standardized visual indicators, such as the Content Credentials icon, to display provenance history to end-users.

Service	Developer	C2PA Implementation Date	User experience C2PA Metadata Surfaced	Trusted Certificates Lists
Behance	Adobe Inc.	2020-10	Content Credential logo Mouse Hover labels list: AI Info • Recorded by; Recorded by; This image has additional info around its history, edits, or attribution. View more (non Adobe software); Adobe Attribution	None
LinkedIn	Microsoft Corporation	2024-05	Content Credential icon Mouse click labels list: AI was used to generate all of this image; AI was used to edit this image; App or device used; Content Credentials issued by; Content Credentials issue date	Not disclosed
TikTok	ByteDance	2024-05	AI-generated; Contains AI-generated media	Not disclosed
Meta	Meta Platforms, Inc.	2024-02	AI info; Captured with a camera	Not disclosed
YouTube	Google LLC	2024-10	AI Mouse click labels list: Made with AI; Captured with a camera; Source Attribution (C2PA conformance program)	Not disclosed
Google search	Google LLC	2024-11	About this image Mouse click labels list: AI-generated; AI-edited; Captured by camera	C2PA Interim Trust List; C2PA Trust List
Pinterest	Pinterest, Inc.	2025-04	AI modified	Not disclosed
X (social network)	SpaceXAI LLC	2026-01	Made with AI	None
DiVine	Verse Communications PBC	2026-04	Human Made	C2PA Trust List

=== Client-Side Verifiers ===
Local applications, browser extensions, mobile apps, or operating system utilities that run directly on an end-user's device. Operating independently of the distributing platform, these utilities perform structural and signature checks by extracting the manifest container directly from the file binary. The utility recalculates the asset's cryptographic hash and compares it to the signed hash within the manifest against a certificate trust list, verifying file integrity.

Application	Developer	Implementation	License	C2PA Conformance Program
Adobe Content Authenticity Inspect (Web application)	Adobe Inc.	2020-10	Proprietary	2.2
C2PA Tool (Command-line interface)	Adobe Inc.	2022-06	Single-vendor Open Source Apache 2.0 / MIT License	no
Content Authenticity Verify (Web application)	Adobe Inc.	2025-08	Single-vendor Open Source Apache 2.0	no
C2PA Verify (Web application)	Adobe Inc.	2026-01	Apache 2.0	no

== Open-source software development kits and libraries ==
=== Adobe and Content Authenticity Initiative ===
- CAI Rust library: It implements the C2PA and CAWG specifications under the name c2pa-rs, to meet the development needs of Adobe software applications. Security vulnerabilities are reported and resolved privately through Adobe's Intigriti platform.
- c2pa-rs wrappers: Language-specific software development kits that wrap around the core Rust implementation to provide functionality across various programming environments. These implementations include:
  - CAI JavaScript library: Integrates C2PA functionality into web applications and Node.js environments using compiled WebAssembly (Wasm) binaries derived from the core c2pa-rs codebase.
  - CAI SDK C++ library: Exposes the core Rust functionality to C++ runtimes.
  - C2PA Python library: Enables Python applications to read and write provenance manifest data.
  - C2PA Swift: Provides native iOS and macOS bindings for Apple ecosystems.
  - C2PA Android library: Enables mobile integration for the Android operating system.

The core library and its wrappers, also known as the Content Credentials SDK, are distributed under the Apache 2.0 License and the MIT License.

=== TrustNXT ===
- c2pa-ts: A standalone TypeScript library designed for reading, creating, and partially validating C2PA 2.1 manifests within web and JavaScript ecosystems. The implementation operates natively without relying on WebAssembly or underlying compiled C binaries.

It is licensed under the Apache 2.0 License.

=== Google ===
- Credentio: A C++ Library developed by Google to support the extraction, validation, generation, and embedding of Content Credentials into Google products. The project is excluded from the Google Open Source Software vulnerability disclosure program.

It is licensed under the Apache 2.0 License.

== Licensing ==
The C2PA specifications are released as an open technical specification under a royalty-free license.

Content Credentials and its logo are Adobe Inc. trademarks, registered with the US Patent and Trademark Office, European Union Intellectual Property Office, and other international trademark authorities.
