= SL3 =

SL3 may refer to:

== Technology and transport ==
- Leica SL3, a mirrorless digital camera
- Canon EOS 250D, or Rebel SL3, a digital reflex camera
- SL3 (MBTA bus), Boston bus line
- Skylab 3 (SL-3), a NASA space mission
- London Buses route SL3

== Other uses ==
- SL3, a postcode district in the SL postcode area in the United Kingdom
- SL3, a para badminton classification
