= Sony FE 24-70mm F2.8 GM II =

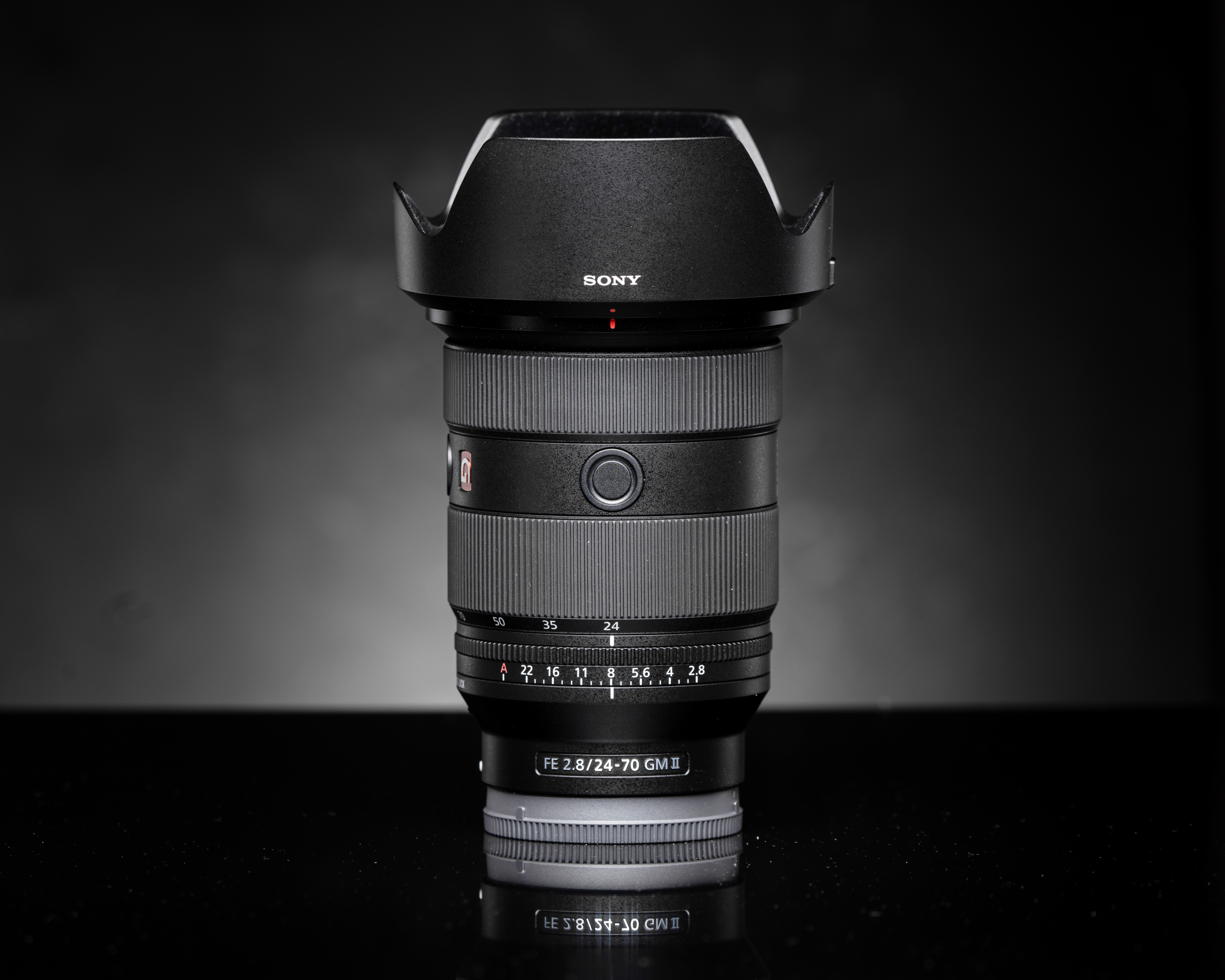
- Maker: Sony
- Lens mount(s): Sony E-mount

Technical data
- Type: Zoom
- Focal length: 24-70mm
- Image format: 35mm full-frame
- Aperture (max/min): f/2.8-22.0
- Close focus distance: 0.21 metres (0.69 ft)
- Max. magnification: 1:4 (0.24x)
- Diaphragm blades: 11
- Construction: 20 elements in 15 groups

Features
- Manual focus override: Yes Yes
- Weather-sealing: Yes Yes
- Lens-based stabilization: No No
- Aperture ring: Yes Yes
- Unique features: GM-series lens
- Application: Multipurpose

Physical
- Max. length: 120 millimetres (4.7 in)
- Diameter: 105 millimetres (4.1 in)
- Weight: 695 grams (1.532 lb)

History
- Introduction: 2022

Retail info
- MSRP: $2299 USD

The Sony FE 24-70mm F2.8 GM II is the second generation premium constant maximum aperture full-frame (FE) standard zoom lens for the Sony E-mount, released in April 2022.

== Technical features ==
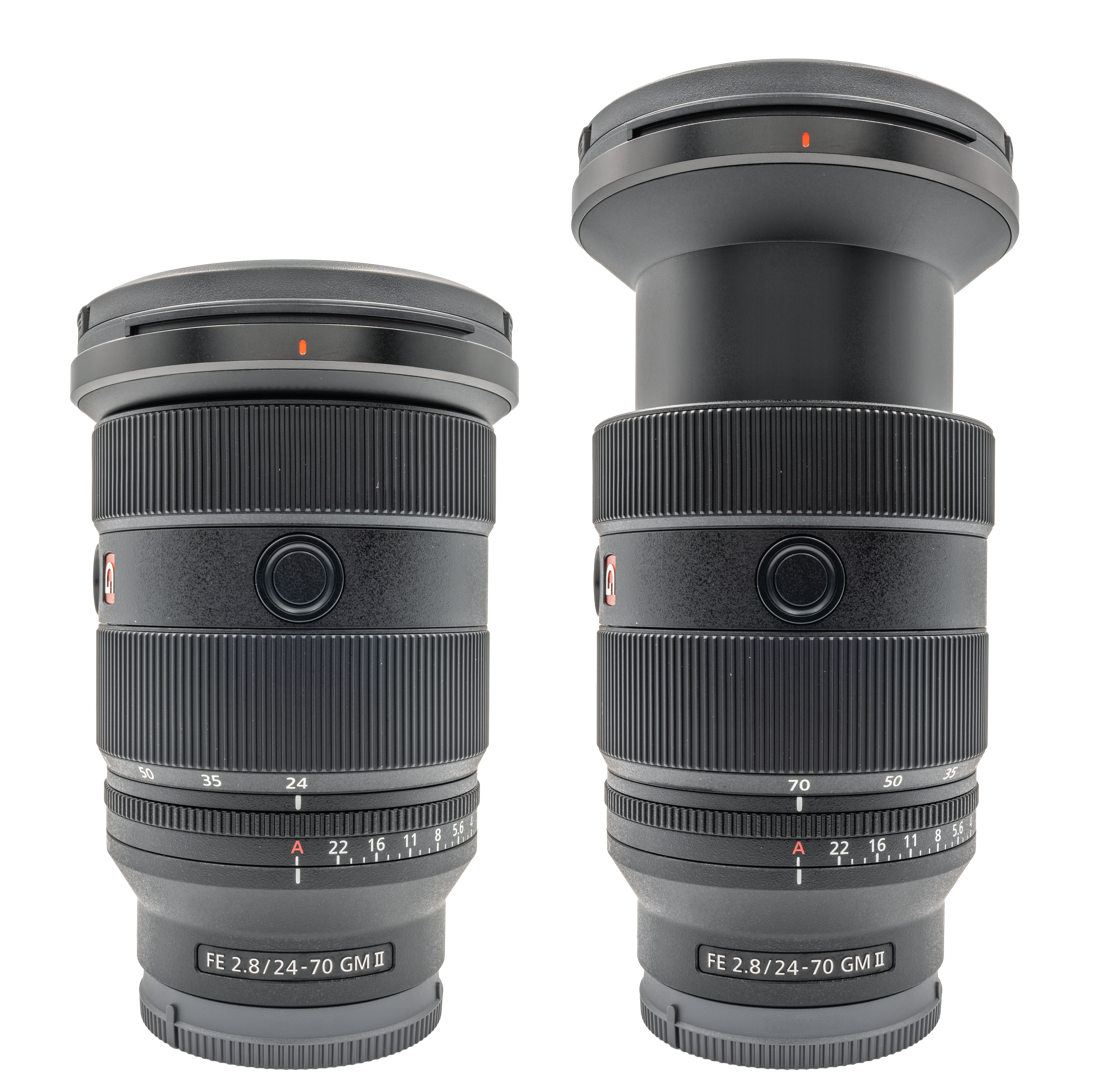
Lens with and without protuded tube

The Sony FE 24-70mm F2.8 GM II comes with three rings in total, one for manual focus, one for zoom and one slimmer for aperture, which is new in this generation. One slider with "smooth" and "tight" allows a more or less resistant rotation of the zooming ring. The click slider allows the switch between continuous in- or decrease of apertures via the aperture ring, which allows smooth changes while filming without latching. The third slider allows an analogue change between autofocus and manual focus. The iris lock slider enables a lock that prohibits an accidental switching to the automatic aperture control on the aperture ring. The lens also has two round buttons for focus hold. Depending on the orientation of the camera, you can use the ergonomically more comfortable one. Properties like automatic or manual focusing and aperture can also be set in the camera settings.

Other components are extreme aspherical elements for chromatic aberration reduction and better resolution results, three aspherical elements, two extra-low dispersion and two Super ED elements. Sony's Nano AR Coating II (AR stands for Anti Reflection) reduces disturbing effects like ghosting effects and four extreme dynamic Linear Motors achieve silent and precise autofocus.

When switching from 24mm to 70mm focal length, the tube protudes up to 3.4 centimeters.

== Equipment ==
The lens itself comes with two lens caps, a lens hood with a sliding hatch and a detach mechanism, a lens bag and a package with manuals.

== Comparison to Sony FE 24-70mm F2.8 GM ==
The most obvious difference to the predecessor is the lighter weight (695 g vs. 886 g) and more compact body (length 120mm vs. 136mm). Image quality has also increased. DxOMark gave a score of 39 points for the Sony FE 24-70mm F2.8 GM II and 32 points for its predecessor, both tested on a Sony A7R IV. The measured sharpness increased from 33 Mpix to 40 Mpix, the measured chromatic aberration decreased from 10 μm to 5 μm, and the distortion (distortion of straight lines in the real world for example) decreased from 0.7 % to 0.4 %. Values like T-Stop transmission (3.2 to 3.1) or vignetting (both -1.6 EV at the image border) stayed rather the same.

== Critics ==
The image sharpness in the image center is rated positively. However, distortions, such as bokeh, or the loss of detail towards the edge of the image are criticized, but some reviewer also disliked the focus breathing. While the lens can exploit the resolution of Sony Alpha 9 cameras to the full, it cannot do so with cameras such as the Sony A7R IV or A7R V.

== See also ==
- List of Sony E-mount lenses
- Sony FE 24-70mm F2.8 GM
