= Sony α7R VI =

2026 full-frame mirrorless camera

Sony Alpha 7R VI (α7R VI, ILCE-7RM6)
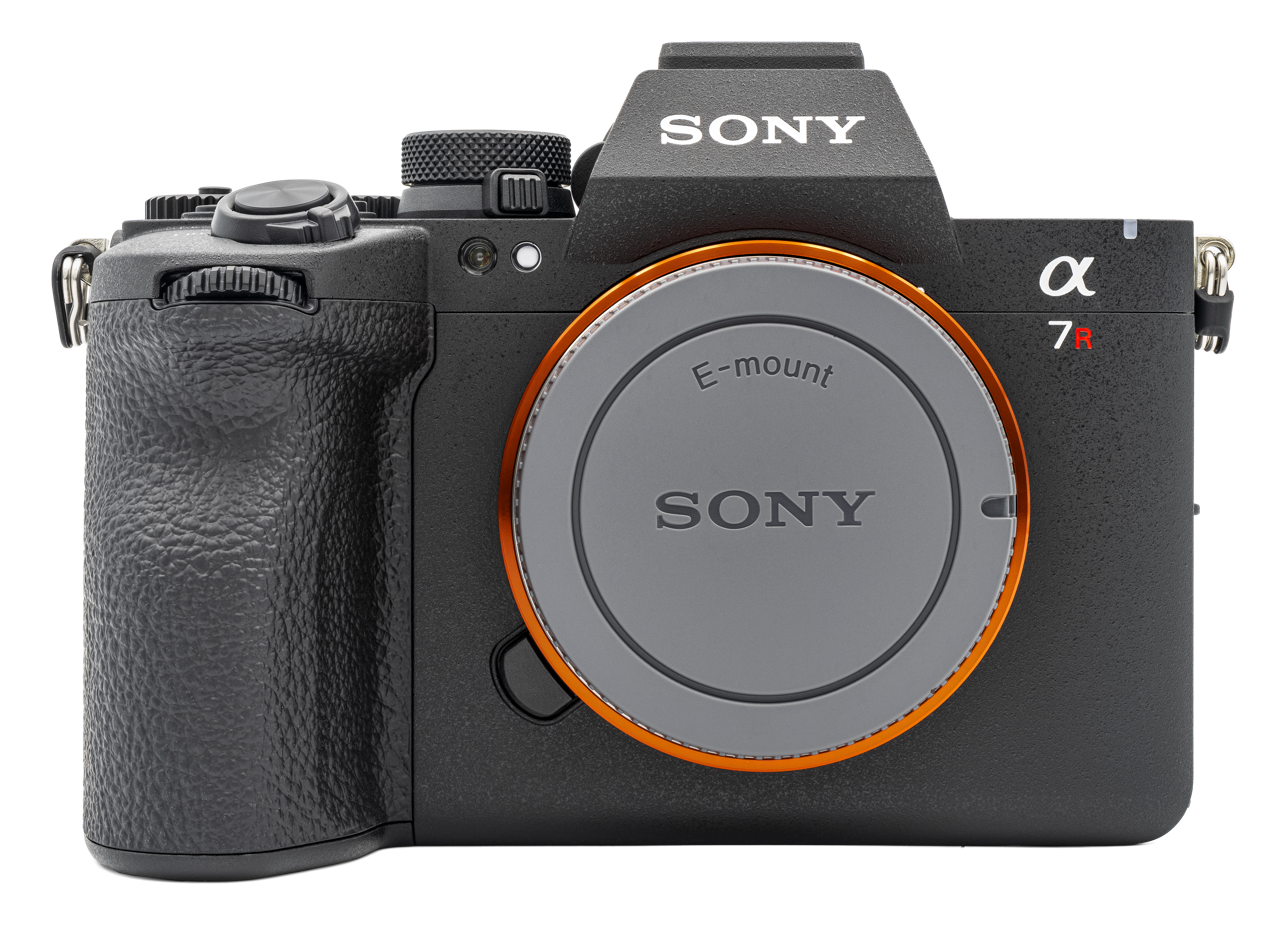

Overview
- Maker: Sony
- Type: Mirrorless interchangeable-lens camera
- Released: May 2026
- Intro price: MSRP $4,498 (USD) £4,399 (GBP) €5,099 (EUR)

Lens
- Lens mount: Sony E-mount

Sensor/medium
- Sensor type: Fully-stacked Exmor RS-CMOS-Full Format Sensor
- Sensor size: Full Frame (35.9 mm × 24 mm)
- Maximum resolution: 9984 × 6656 Pixel (66.8 megapixels)
- Film speed: ISO 100–32000 (expandable to ISO 50–102400)
- Recording medium: SD, SDHC, or SDXC memory card supporting UHS-II bus, CFexpress Type A (dual slots)

Focusing
- Focus: Fast hybrid autofocus (AF phase detection and AF contrast detection)
- Focus areas: 759 phase-detection points

Shutter
- Shutter speeds: 1/8000 – 30 sec, BULB
- Continuous shooting: 10 FPS (mechanical) 140 frames lossless compressed raw or 220 compressed raw. 30 FPS (electronic) 70 frames lossless compressed raw or 75 compressed raw

Viewfinder
- Optional viewfinders: 1.6 cm viewfinder (Quad-XGA, OLED, HDR)
- Viewfinder magnification: 0.9x

Image processing
- Image processor: BIONZ XR2

General
- Video recording: 8K/30p (XAVC HS, 10-bit, 4:2:2, oversampled from 8.2K), 4K/120p (10-bit, 4:2:2)
- LCD screen: 8.0 cm LCD-TFT
- Battery: NP-SA100 lithium-ion battery, approx 600 shots (EVF) or 710 shots (LCD)
- AV port: HDMI
- Data port: USB Type C (2×)
- Body features: Illuminated Buttons, 8.5-stop IBIS
- Dimensions: 132.7×96.9×82.9 mm (5.22×3.81×3.26 in)
- Weight: 713 g (25 oz) (with battery and card)

Chronology
- Predecessor: Sony α7R V

The Sony α7R VI (model ILCE-7RM6) is a full-frame mirrorless interchangeable-lens camera manufactured by Sony. The camera was announced in May 2026 as the successor to the Sony α7R V approximately 3 years prior.

== Camera System ==
The Sony a7R VI is the first camera since the Sony α7R IV (2019) to feature an increased pixel count. The sensor area measures 35.9 mm × 24 mm; which is 1.4% larger than its predecessor. The sensor is an Exmor RS sensor, the "R“ stands for "rear-illuminated“ and the "S“ for "stacked“. The back-illuminated design provides high speed, low noise and high sensitivity. The stacked image sensor achieves up to 5.6 times faster sensor readout speed compared to its predecessor. With the electronic shutter the camera can capture 30 full-resolution frames per second; with the mechanical one 10.

== Improvements over the predecessor ==
The main focus of the improvement is on speed in both processing and subject selection. In addition to the higher resolution of the sensor the electronic shutter readout speed has been reduced from 100 ms to 19.8 ms This allows for reduced visual impact caused by the rolling shutter, especially with moving subjects or shots taken inside a moving vehicle. According to Sony, the dynamic range increased from 14.8 to 16 EVs, more than doubling it. This allows for less noise in dark areas and less effort when implementing HDR workflows. The battery also received a redesign, the new "NP-SA100" battery features a different form factor and bigger capacity. The IBIS was increased by half a stop to 8.5. Like the predecessor, this model offers 8K recording (from 24 to 30 fps) and 4:2:2 chroma subsampling, thanks to the faster sensor readout speed the rolling shutter effect is greatly reduced. This enables 120 Minutes of 8K recording time. The cooling is handled by a sigma-shaped graphite chamber.

== Gallery ==
Display view

Top view

Available ports

Storage card view

View with flipped screen

Bottom view

Camera body with mounted lens

Family	Level	Format	'10	2011		2012	2013	2014	2015	2016	2017	2018	2019	2020	2021	2022	2023	2024	2025	2026
Alpha (α)	Indust	FF																ILX-LR1 ^{●}		
Alpha (α)	Cine line	FF													_{m} FX6 ^{●}					
Alpha (α)	Cine line	FF																		_{m} FX5 ^{AT●}
Alpha (α)	Cine line	FF													_{m} FX3 ^{AT●}					
Alpha (α)	Cine line	FF																		_{m} FX2 ^{AT●}
Alpha (α)	Flag	FF													_{m} α1 ^{FT●}				_{m} α1 II ^{FAT●}	
Alpha (α)	Speed	FF										_{m} α9 ^{FT●}			_{m} α9 II ^{FT●}				_{m} α9 III ^{FAT●}	
Alpha (α)	Sens	FF							_{m} α7S ^{●}	_{m} α7S II ^{F●}					_{m} α7S III ^{AT●}					
Alpha (α)	Hi-Res	FF						_{m} α7R ^{●}		_{m} α7R II ^{F●}		_{m} α7R III ^{FT●}		_{m} α7R IV ^{FT●}			_{m} α7R V ^{FAT●}			_{m} α7R VI ^{FAT●}
Alpha (α)	Basic	FF						_{m} α7 ^{F●}	_{m} α7 II ^{F●}				_{m} α7 III ^{FT●}			_{m} α7 IV ^{AT●}				_{m} α7 V ^{FAT●}
Alpha (α)	Compact	FF																_{m} α7CR ^{AT●}		
Alpha (α)	Compact	FF													_{m} α7C ^{AT●}			_{m} α7C II ^{AT●}		
Alpha (α)	Vlog	FF																_{m} ZV-E1 ^{AT●}		
Alpha (α)	Cine	APS-C															_{m} FX30 ^{AT●}			
Alpha (α)	Adv	APS-C			_{s} NEX-7 ^{F●}						_{m} α6500 ^{FT●}			_{m} α6600 ^{FT●}				_{m} α6700 ^{AT●}		
Alpha (α)	Mid-range	APS-C				_{m} NEX-6 ^{F●}					_{m} α6300 ^{F●}		_{m} α6400 ^{F+T●}							
Alpha (α)	Mid-range	APS-C						_{m} α6000 ^{F●}						_{m} α6100 ^{FT●}						
Alpha (α)	Vlog	APS-C														_{m} ZV-E10 ^{AT●}			_{m} ZV-E10 II ^{AT●}	
Alpha (α)	Entry-level	APS-C	NEX-5 ^{F●}	NEX-5N ^{FT●}		NEX-5R ^{F+T●}	NEX-5T ^{F+T●}		α5100 ^{F+T●}											
Alpha (α)	Entry-level	APS-C	NEX-3 ^{F●}	NEX-C3 ^{F●}		NEX-F3 ^{F+●}	NEX-3N ^{F+●}	α5000 ^{F+●}												
DSLR-style		APS-C					_{m} α3000 ^{●}		_{m} α3500 ^{●}											
SmartShot		APS-C							QX1 ^{M●}											
CineAlta	Cine line	FF										VENICE				VENICE 2				
CineAlta	Cine line	FF																BURANO		
XDCAM	Cine line	FF												_{m} FX9						
XDCAM	Docu	S35							_{m} FS7		_{m} FS7 II									
XDCAM	Mobile	S35								_{m} FS5			_{m} FS5 II							
NXCAM	Pro	S35		NEX-FS100		NEX-FS700	NEX-FS700R													
NXCAM	APS-C					NEX-EA50														
Handycam	FF					_{m} NEX-VG900														
Handycam	APS-C		_{s} NEX-VG10		_{s} NEX-VG20	_{m} NEX-VG30														
Security		FF									SNC-VB770									
Security		FF									UMC-S3C									
Family	Level	Format																		
Family	Level	Format	'10	2011		2012	2013	2014	2015	2016	2017	2018	2019	2020	2021	2022	2023	2024	2025	2026
