= Content Authenticity Initiative =

Industry advocacy coalition and Adobe corporate business unit

- Abbreviation: CAI
- Formation: November 4, 2019; 6 years ago
- Founder: Adobe Inc., The New York Times , Twitter
- Type: Industry advocacy coalition / Corporate business unit
- Headquarters: Adobe World Headquarters; 345 Park Avenue; San Jose, CA 95110-2704; United States
- Members: ~1,000+ organizations, corporate partners and individuals
- Senior Director: Andy Parsons
- Advocacy and Education: Santiago Lyon
- Principal Engineer: Eric Scouten
- Chief Architect: Leonard Rosenthol
- Parent organization: Adobe Inc. (operates internally as a dedicated business unit)
- Employees: None (operated by dedicated Adobe Inc. personnel and member contributions)
- Website: contentauthenticity.org

The Content Authenticity Initiative (CAI) is an industry advocacy coalition and corporate business unit of Adobe Inc. that promotes the adoption of digital media provenance and attribution standards. Founded to mitigate digital misinformation, the organization advocates for an open, interoperable framework to establish verifiable transparency for digital assets.

The initiative engages in public education, industry outreach, and regulatory advocacy regarding digital safety and artificial intelligence (AI) transparency standardizations. Structurally, the CAI supports the deployment of specifications developed by two technical standards organizations: the Coalition for Content Provenance and Authenticity (C2PA) and the Creators Assertions Working Group (CAWG). To facilitate ecosystem adoption, the CAI develops and maintains open-source software development kits (SDKs) that allow software engineers to integrate provenance tracking features directly into third-party applications and digital services.

The primary consumer-facing implementation of this technical architecture is branded as Content Credentials. Content Credentials function as tamper-evident metadata packages cryptographically bound to digital media files. These packages record structural provenance, asset attribution, and historical editing data over the lifecycle of a digital file.

== Coalition for Content Provenance and Authenticity ==
The Coalition for Content Provenance and Authenticity (C2PA) is an open, cross-industry technical standards body established on February 22, 2021. It was formed to unify the technical specifications of two existing content attribution frameworks: the Adobe-led Content Authenticity Initiative (CAI) and Project Origin, a joint news-ecosystem initiative created by Microsoft and the BBC. The six founding corporate members of the coalition were Adobe, Arm, BBC, Intel, Microsoft, and Truepic. The C2PA operates structurally as a project under the Joint Development Foundation (JDF), an affiliate of the Linux Foundation.

=== Governance and Leadership ===
Upon its formation in 2021, the organization's governance structure separated administrative, technical, and public policy leadership:

- Chair: Andrew Jenks, Director of Content Integrity at Microsoft, served as the overall Chair of the organization.
- Technical Working Group Chair: Leonard Rosenthol, Senior Principal Scientist at Adobe, was appointed to oversee the development of technical specification drafts.
- Government Affairs Committee Co-Chairs: Mounir Ibrahim, Chief Communications Officer and Head of Public Affairs at Truepic (formerly with the U.S. Department of State), and Matt Schrader, Director of Government Relations and Public Policy at Adobe (formerly Vice President at Dutko Worldwide), were appointed to lead the organization's public policy and government relations efforts.

In 2026, Clément Wolf, Director of Responsible AI Strategy, Trust & Safety at Google, succeeded Andrew Jenks as the overall Chair of the C2PA.

=== Organizational support ===
While the C2PA operates as an independent technical standards body, it receives operational and external engagement support directly from its member corporations. According to corporate accountability reports submitted to European Union regulators, Adobe dedicates internal employees from its Communications and Public Policy divisions to manage global outreach, press relations, and regulatory advocacy for the C2PA framework.

The coalition also partners The Information Technology Industry Council (ITI) and The Information Technology and Innovation Foundation (ITIF) to promote its provenance specifications.

== Creators Assertions Working Group ==
The Creators Assertions Working Group (CAWG) is a standards development organization that defines supplementary standards for digital identity, publishing, licensing, and schema-based assertions. These specifications function as extensions to the Content Credentials framework established by the C2PA. The primary purpose of the CAWG specifications is to allow content creators to securely bind a digital identity to digital content, establishing authorship within the C2PA ecosystem.

Initial technical development on the Identity "2.0" assertion model began in September 2023 under Adobe's Eric Scouten, who managed early private drafts and presented the framework to the Internet Identity Workshop and the Content Authenticity Initiative (CAI) Summit. The CAWG formally originated as an Adobe-led working group in early 2024 to host the identity specification alongside other custom assertions removed from the core C2PA 2.0 standard (including training, data mining, and endorsements). In March 2025, the CAWG joined the Decentralized Identity Foundation (DIF) to operate as an independent standards group under a joint collaboration agreement with the Trust Over IP Project and the Linux Foundation Decentralized Trust.

== Open-source software ==
The CAI manages a suite of open-source software reference implementations for the C2PA and the CAWG specifications. While the projects are branded under the CAI umbrella, software development and repository maintenance are driven almost entirely by Adobe under a corporate-led, single-vendor governance model.

Within the documentation, the proprietary Adobe Content Authenticity Inspect (ACA Inspect) application is promoted as a C2PA conforming validator for Content Credentials. Independent technology researchers and critics have noted a divergence between the software's implementation and the initiative's stated objectives. While the broader CAI ecosystem emphasizes open-source development and outlines user privacy as a core guiding principle, the consumer-facing "Inspect" application remains proprietary and utilizes analytics and identification cookies.

=== C2PA tool ===
The C2PA Tool is the official command-line interface utility developed to read, cryptographically sign, and verify Content Credentials directly within digital media assets.

=== C2PA Verify/C2PA Conformance Tool ===
The C2PA Conformance Tool is a web application used to validate C2PA manifests and CAWG assertions associated with media files. The tool evaluates digital assets against a set of rules written in YAML to make sure they follow the official guidelines.

=== Software development kits and libraries ===
The ecosystem is built around a core Rust library. Specialized language bindings and platform wrappers are maintained across several environments:

- System & Desktop: Rust, C++, and Python
- Mobile Platforms: Android and iOS
- Web & JavaScript Runtimes: Web browsers via WebAssembly bindings, and Node.js via a compiled native binary addon.

== Provenance of information ==
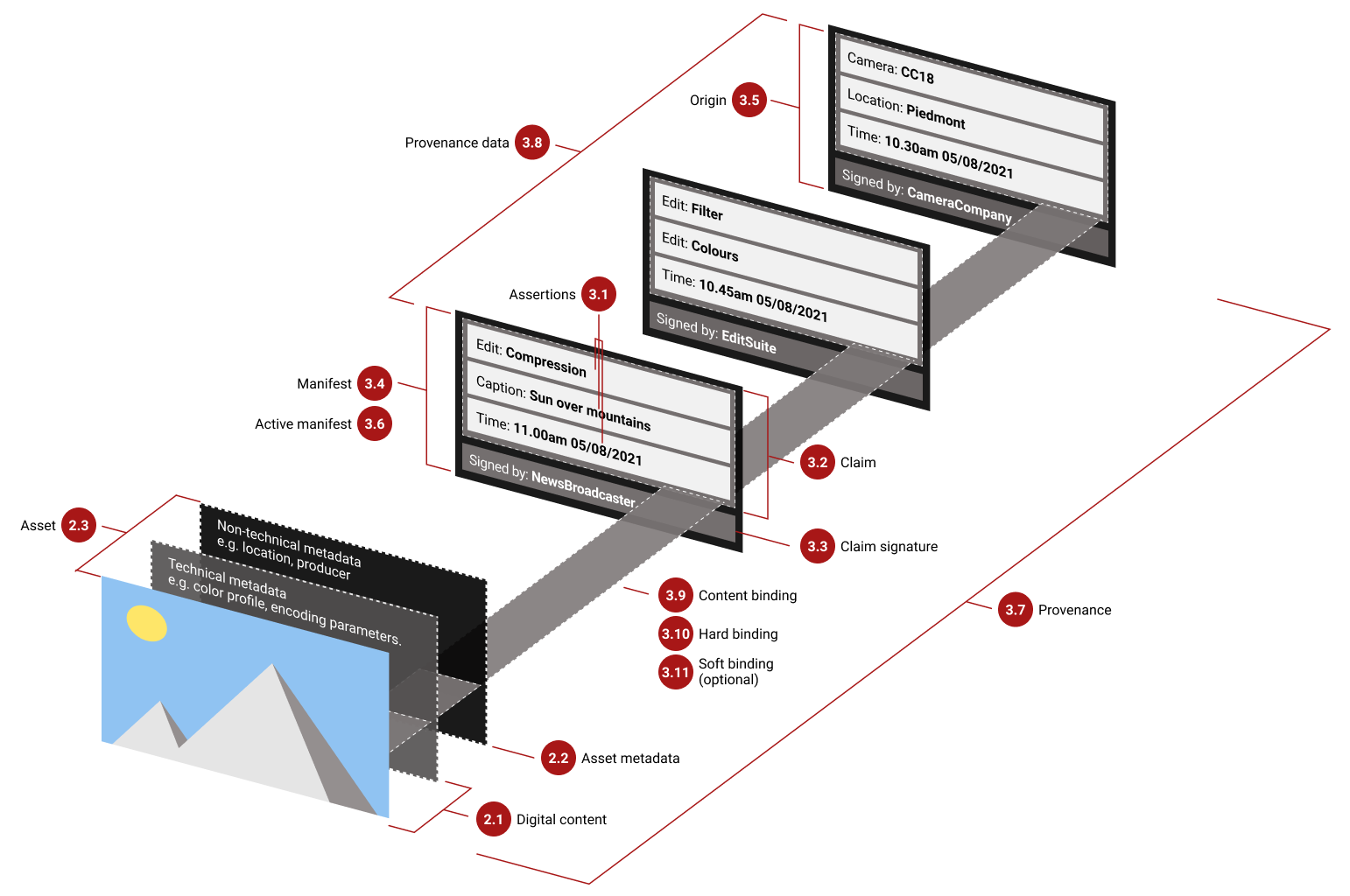
The structure of C2PA metadata in a file with multiple Manifests generated when the picture was recorded, edited and published

The procedures proposed by CAI and C2PA aim to address the widespread occurrence of disinformation with a set of additional data (metadata) containing details about the provenance of information displayed on a digital device. Such information can be, for example, a photo, video, sound or text file. The C2PA metadata for this information can include, among other things, the publisher of the information, the device used to record the information, the location and time of the recording or editing steps that altered the information. To mitigate risks that the C2PA metadata might be changed unnoticed, it is secured with hashcodes and certified digital signatures. The same applies to the main information content, such as a picture or a text. A hash code of that data is stored in the C2PA metadata section and then, as part of that metadata, secured with the digital signature.

Securing metadata and the main content with certified signatures helps users to identify the provenance of a file they are currently viewing. If the C2PA metadata names, for example, a certain TV station as the publisher of a file, it is supposed to be very unlikely that the file originated from another source.

Files with C2PA-compliant metadata that are copied from a publisher's website and then published unaltered on social media (or elsewhere) still retain the provenance information. Users seeing that content on social media can examine such a file with an online tool offered by the CAI or, if present, with C2PA-compliant inspection tools of their own or those offered by the social media site. Standard-compliant tools are designed to detect whether there were any unauthorized modifications to the file or the metadata.

The methods proposed by CAI and C2PA do not allow for statements whether a content is "true", i.e., contains authentic information that faithfully reflects reality. Instead, C2PA-compliant metadata only offers reliable information about the origin of a piece of information. Whether users want to trust this information depends solely on their trust in its sources and the C2PA approach.

== Criticism ==
One criticism of C2PA is that it can compromise the privacy of people who sign things with it, due to the large amount of metadata in the digital labels it creates.

Experts have also documented ways in which attackers can bypass C2PA’s safeguards, by altering provenance metadata, removing or forging watermarks, and mimicking digital fingerprints.

Besides the fact that C2PA doesn't address the question of whether the content is accurate, another shortcoming is that typical signing tools don't verify the accuracy of the metadata either, so users can't rely on the provenance data either unless they have reason to trust that the signer properly verified it.

== Members ==
As of September 2026, the CAI reports a total membership exceeding 5,000 participants, representing diverse organizations (non-profit, industry, media, education, government) as well as individuals.

The official public member directory lists 1,053 entities, limited to formal institutional organizations, corporate partners, and members who have explicitly opted to establish a public profile.
