= Sony FE 24-70mm F2.8 GM =

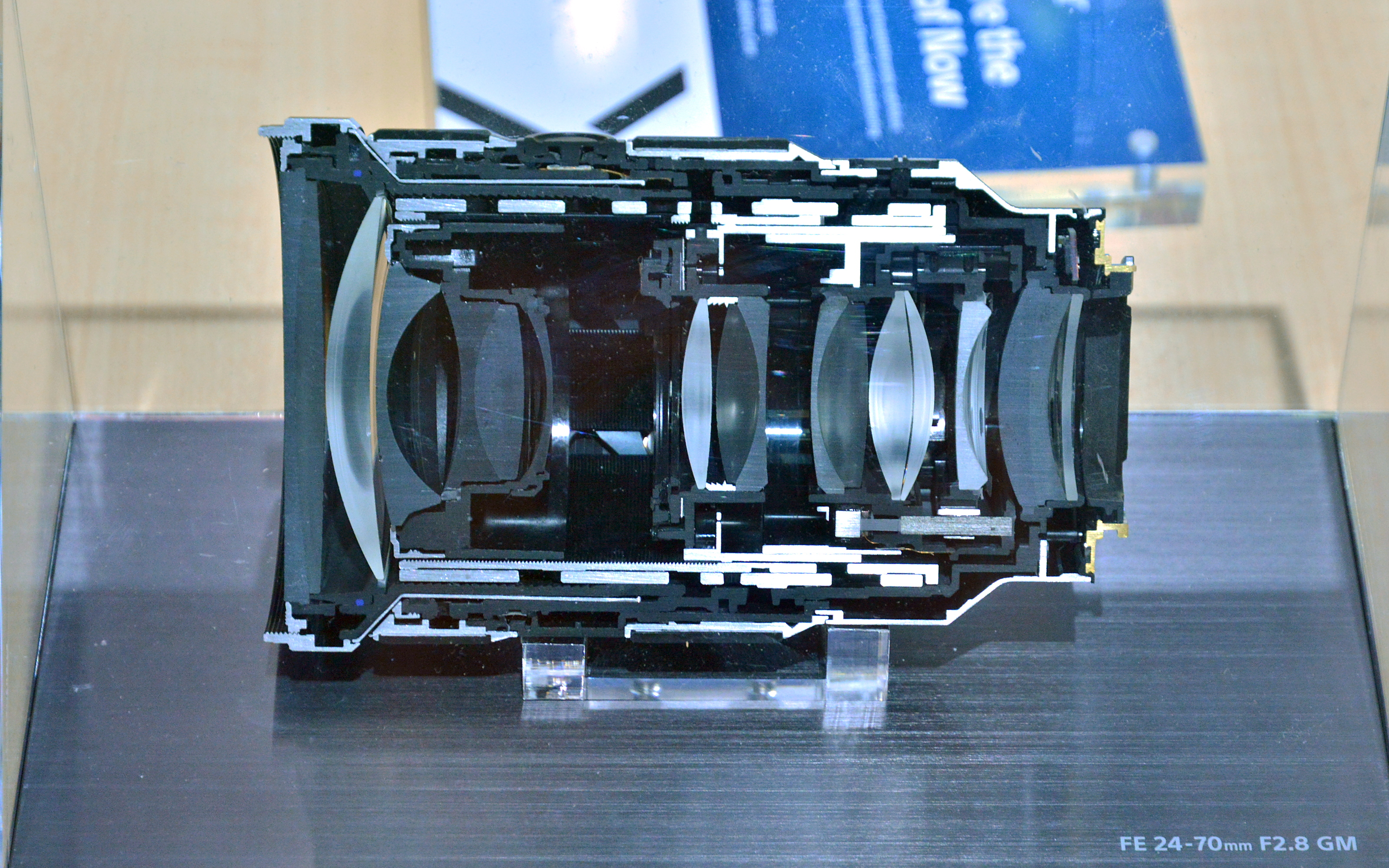
- Maker: Sony
- Lens mount(s): Sony E-mount

Technical data
- Type: Zoom
- Focus drive: Piezoelectric
- Focal length: 24-70mm
- Image format: 35mm full-frame
- Aperture (max/min): f/2.8 -22.0
- Close focus distance: 0.38 metres (1.2 ft)
- Max. magnification: 1:4 (0.24x)
- Diaphragm blades: 9
- Construction: 18 elements in 13 groups

Features
- Manual focus override: Yes Yes
- Weather-sealing: Yes Yes
- Lens-based stabilization: No No
- Aperture ring: No No
- Unique features: GM-series lens
- Application: Multipurpose

Physical
- Max. length: 136 millimetres (5.4 in)
- Diameter: 87.6 millimetres (3.45 in)
- Weight: 886 grams (1.953 lb)
- Filter diameter: 82mm

Accessories
- Lens hood: Petal-shape

History
- Introduction: 2016

Retail info
- MSRP: $2199 USD

The Sony FE 24-70mm F2.8 GM is a premium constant maximum aperture full-frame (FE) zoom lens for the Sony E-mount, announced by Sony on February 3, 2016.

Though designed for Sony's full frame E-mount cameras, the lens can be used on Sony's APS-C E-mount camera bodies, with an equivalent full-frame field-of-view of 36-105mm.

In 2022, an updated version of this lens called the Sony FE 24-70mm F2.8 GM II was released. It is the smallest and lightest full-frame 24-70mm F2.8 lens on the market at 120 millimeters in length and 695 grams.

== Build quality ==
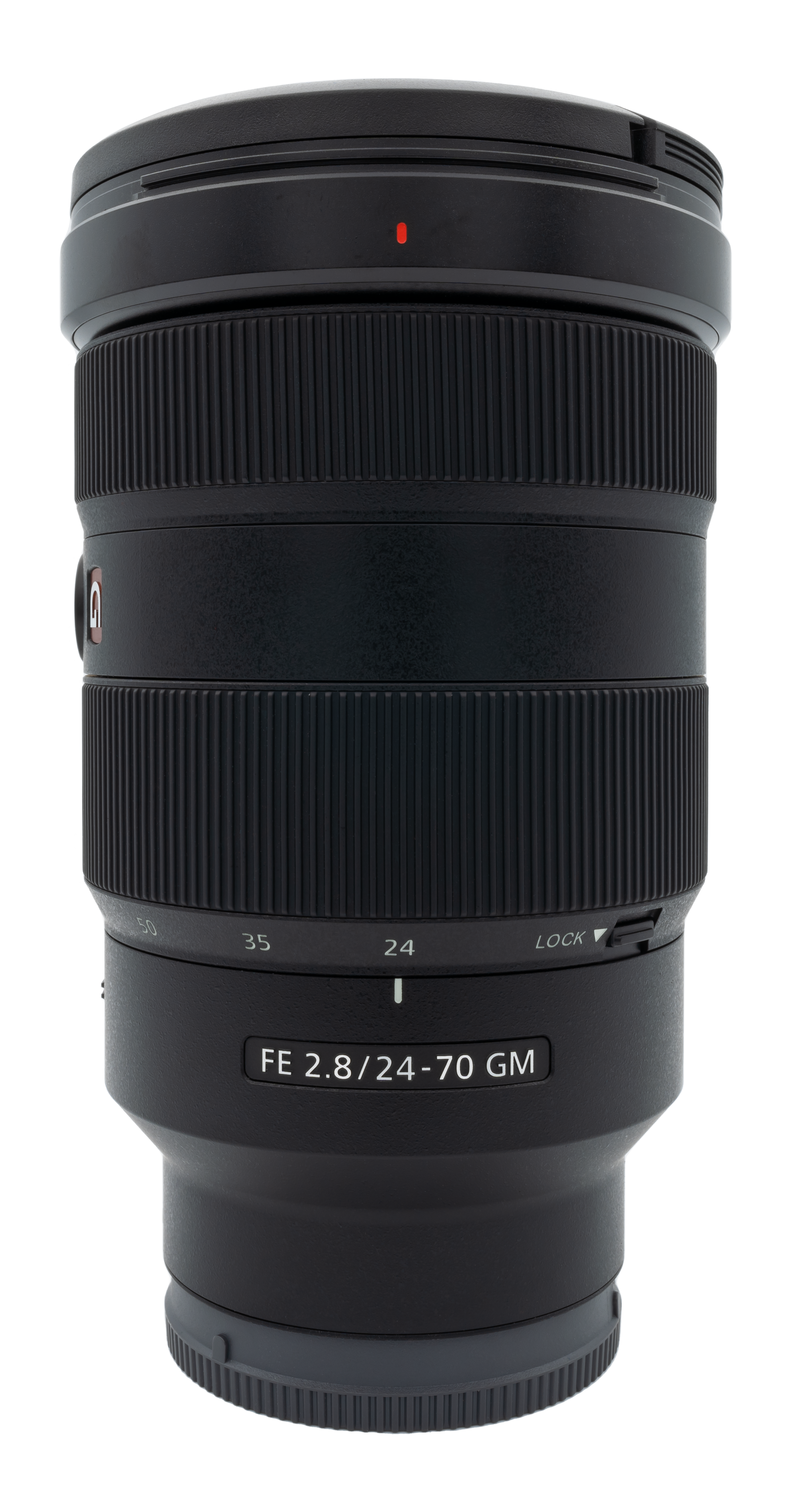
Front view with visible zoom lock

The lens showcases a matte-black weather resistant plastic exterior with a rubber focus and zoom ring. There is also a zoom lock to prevent zoom creep and an Autofocus-Manual focus switch. The barrel of the lens telescopes outward from the main lens body as it's zoomed in from 24mm to 70mm.

== See also ==
- Sony FE 24-70mm F4 ZA OSS
- List of Sony E-mount lenses
- List of standard zoom lenses
