= Sony Carl Zeiss Vario-Tessar T* FE 24-70mm F4 ZA OSS =

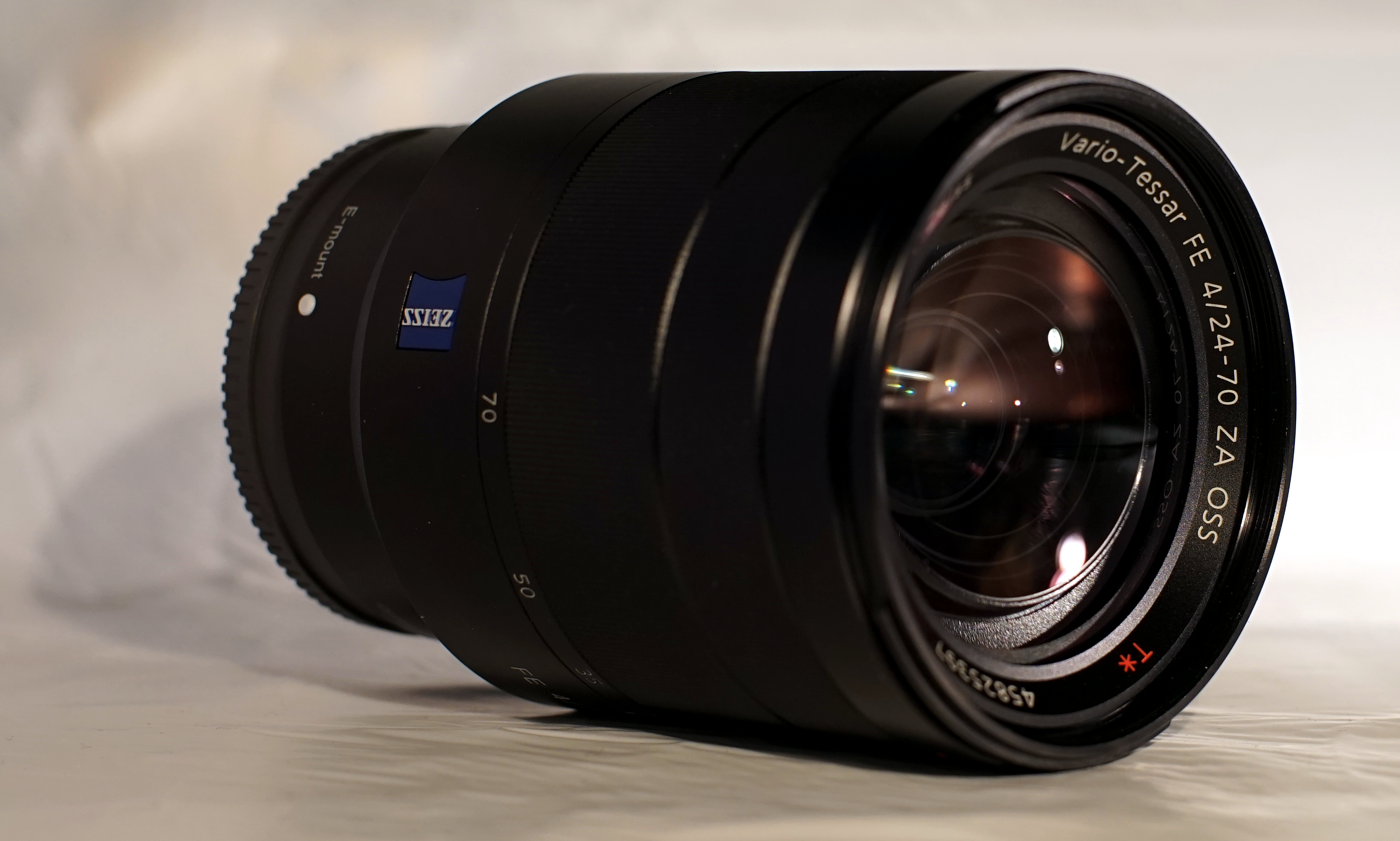
- Maker: Sony
- Lens mount(s): Sony E-mount

Technical data
- Type: Zoom
- Focal length: 24-70mm
- Image format: 35mm full-frame
- Aperture (max/min): f/4.0 -22.0
- Close focus distance: 0.40 metres (1.3 ft)
- Max. magnification: 0.20x
- Diaphragm blades: 7
- Construction: 12 elements in 10 groups

Features
- Manual focus override: Yes Yes
- Weather-sealing: Yes Yes
- Lens-based stabilization: Yes Yes
- Aperture ring: No No
- Unique features: Carl Zeiss approved
- Application: Multipurpose

Physical
- Max. length: 94.5 millimetres (3.72 in)
- Diameter: 73.0 millimetres (2.87 in)
- Weight: 426 grams (0.939 lb)
- Filter diameter: 67mm

Accessories
- Lens hood: Petal-shape

History
- Introduction: 2013

Retail info
- MSRP: $1199 USD

The Sony Zeiss Vario-Tessar T* FE 24-70mm F4 ZA OSS is a constant maximum aperture full-frame (FE) zoom lens for the Sony E-mount, announced by Sony on October 16, 2013.

Though designed for Sony's full frame E-mount cameras, the lens can be used on Sony's APS-C E-mount camera bodies, with an equivalent full-frame field-of-view of 36-105mm.

== Build quality ==
The lens showcases a minimalist black weather resistant metal exterior with a Zeiss badge on the side of the barrel and no zoom lock to prevent zoom creep. Both the zoom and focus rings are metal. The barrel of the lens telescopes outward from the main lens body as it's zoomed in from 24mm to 70mm.

== See also ==
- Sony FE 24-70mm F2.8 GM
- Zeiss Vario-Tessar
- List of Sony E-mount lenses
- List of standard zoom lenses
