= Sony α1 II =

2024 full-frame mirrorless camera

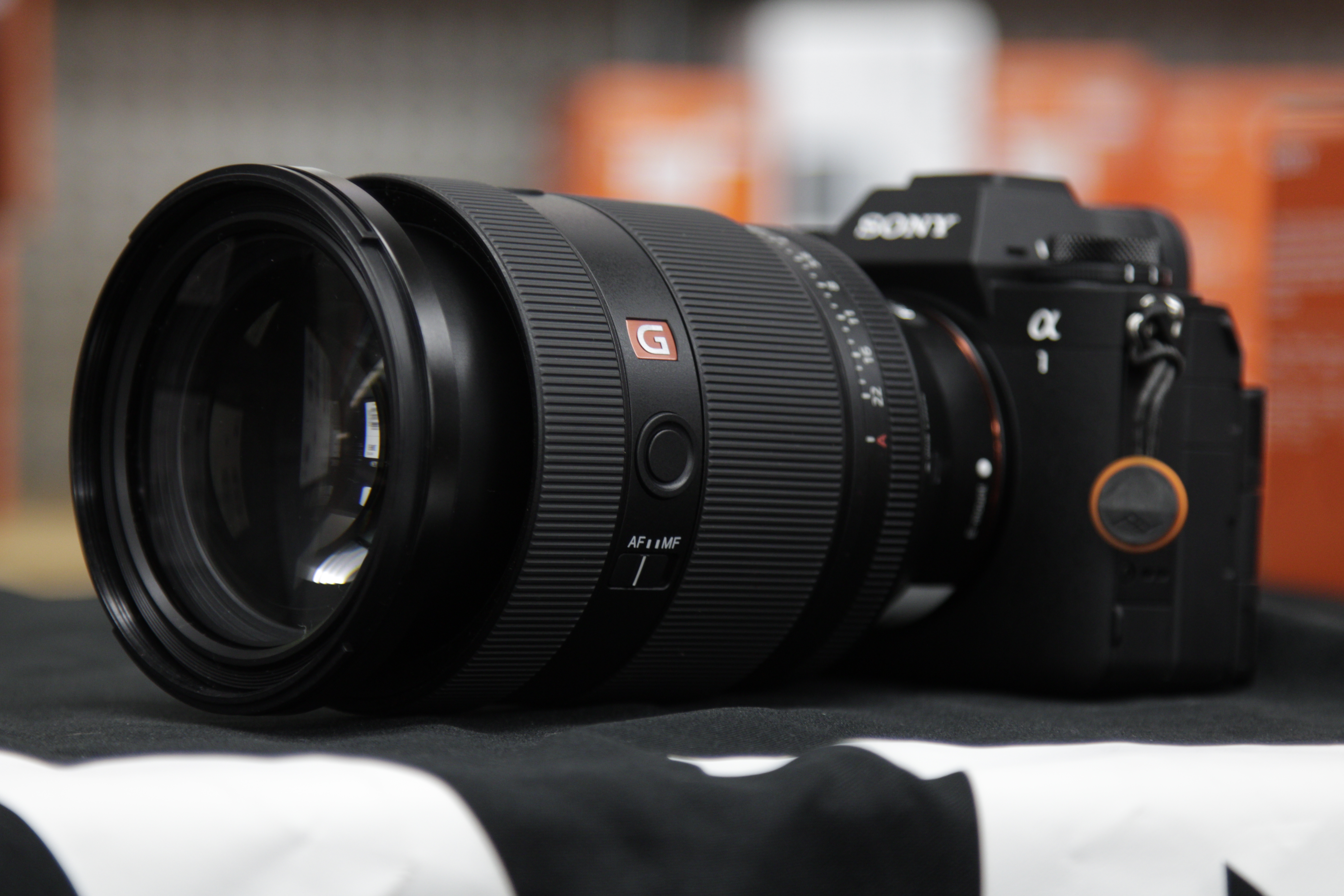

Overview
- Maker: Sony
- Type: Full Frame MILC
- Released: November 19, 2024; 19 months ago
- Intro price: USD 6,499.99 (body)

Lens
- Lens mount: Sony E-mount
- Lens: Interchangeable lens

Sensor/medium
- Sensor: Full Frame
- Sensor type: Exmor RS CMOS
- Sensor size: 35.9 × 24.0 mm Full Frame
- Sensor maker: Sony
- Maximum resolution: 50.1 megapixels 8640 × 5760
- Film speed: ISO 100–32000, expandable to ISO 50 and 102400
- Storage media: Dual Slot CFexpress 2.0 Type A, SD, SDHC, SDXC; UHS-II, UHS-I

Flash
- Flash: External flash
- Flash synchronization: 1/400s (1/500s APS-C)
- Compatible flashes: Shoe Mount flash

Shutter
- Shutter: Electronically controlled, vertical-traverse, focal-plane type
- Shutter speeds: 1/8000 to 30 seconds, bulb
- Continuous shooting: 30.0 fps

Viewfinder
- Viewfinder: EVF with eye sensor
- Electronic viewfinder: 0.64" 9.4M dots OLED Viewfinder
- Viewfinder magnification: 0.9
- Frame coverage: 100%

Image processing
- Image processor: BIONZ XR + AI Processing Unit

General
- Video recording: XAVC S, XAVC HS; 8K up to 30 fps, 4K up to 120 fps(1.1x crop), 1080p up to 240 fps
- LCD screen: 3.0" 1.44M dots touchscreen variable-angle monitor
- Battery: NP-FZ100 Li-ion
- AV port(s): HDMI A, ⌀3.5 mm audio jack
- Data port(s): USB C 3.2, LAN 2.5GbE, Wi-Fi 5, Bluetooth 5.0
- Body features: Magnesium Alloy Body, Active Mode optical image stabilization, Image Sensor-Shift, Anti-Dust System
- Dimensions: 136.1 mm × 96.9 mm × 82.9 mm (5.36 in × 3.81 in × 3.26 in)
- Weight: 743 g (26 oz) (1.638 lb) including battery and memory card
- Latest firmware: 4.00 / 30 October 2025; 8 months ago
- Made in: Thailand

Chronology
- Predecessor: Sony α1

The Sony α1 II (model ILCE-1M2) is a full-frame mirrorless interchangeable-lens camera by Sony that was announced on November 19, 2024, alongside the Sony FE 28-70mm f/2 GM lens. The camera became available in December 2024 starting at US$6500 and is aimed at professional photographers and videographers, covering wildlife, sports, action and landscape.

== Features ==
- 50.1MP Exmor RS stacked BSI CMOS sensor
- 15 stops dynamic range and Composite RAW modes for lower noise and higher resolution
- 30.0 fps shooting with 400 JPEG image buffer (or 240 compressed RAW)
- Burst shooting and pre-capture 0.03s-1s
- 120 times per second AF and AE calculation
- 30% improvement in eye detection for animals and humans and a 50% boost in bird eye detection
- 4-Axis Tilting Touchscreen LCD
- 5-axis in-body image stabilization, up to 8.5 stops
- 8K30p, 4K120p and 1080P240p 10bit 4:2:2 video
- Super 35mm 5.8k oversampling to 4K, 30fps
- 240 Hz OLED electronic viewfinder
- Expanded ISO 50–102,400
- Multi Interface Shoe with digital audio interface

== See also ==
- List of Sony E-mount cameras
- Sony α1

Family	Level	Format	'10	2011		2012	2013	2014	2015	2016	2017	2018	2019	2020	2021	2022	2023	2024	2025	2026
Alpha (α)	Indust	FF																ILX-LR1 ^{●}		
Alpha (α)	Cine line	FF													_{m} FX6 ^{●}					
Alpha (α)	Cine line	FF													_{m} FX3 ^{AT●}					
Alpha (α)	Cine line	FF																		_{m} FX2 ^{AT●}
Alpha (α)	Flag	FF													_{m} α1 ^{FT●}				_{m} α1 II ^{FAT●}	
Alpha (α)	Speed	FF										_{m} α9 ^{FT●}			_{m} α9 II ^{FT●}				_{m} α9 III ^{FAT●}	
Alpha (α)	Sens	FF							_{m} α7S ^{●}	_{m} α7S II ^{F●}					_{m} α7S III ^{AT●}					
Alpha (α)	Hi-Res	FF						_{m} α7R ^{●}		_{m} α7R II ^{F●}		_{m} α7R III ^{FT●}		_{m} α7R IV ^{FT●}			_{m} α7R V ^{FAT●}			_{m} α7R VI ^{FAT●}
Alpha (α)	Basic	FF						_{m} α7 ^{F●}	_{m} α7 II ^{F●}				_{m} α7 III ^{FT●}			_{m} α7 IV ^{AT●}				_{m} α7 V ^{FAT●}
Alpha (α)	Compact	FF																_{m} α7CR ^{AT●}		
Alpha (α)	Compact	FF													_{m} α7C ^{AT●}			_{m} α7C II ^{AT●}		
Alpha (α)	Vlog	FF																_{m} ZV-E1 ^{AT●}		
Alpha (α)	Cine	APS-C															_{m} FX30 ^{AT●}			
Alpha (α)	Adv	APS-C			_{s} NEX-7 ^{F●}						_{m} α6500 ^{FT●}			_{m} α6600 ^{FT●}				_{m} α6700 ^{AT●}		
Alpha (α)	Mid-range	APS-C				_{m} NEX-6 ^{F●}					_{m} α6300 ^{F●}		_{m} α6400 ^{F+T●}							
Alpha (α)	Mid-range	APS-C						_{m} α6000 ^{F●}						_{m} α6100 ^{FT●}						
Alpha (α)	Vlog	APS-C														_{m} ZV-E10 ^{AT●}			_{m} ZV-E10 II ^{AT●}	
Alpha (α)	Entry-level	APS-C	NEX-5 ^{F●}	NEX-5N ^{FT●}		NEX-5R ^{F+T●}	NEX-5T ^{F+T●}		α5100 ^{F+T●}											
Alpha (α)	Entry-level	APS-C	NEX-3 ^{F●}	NEX-C3 ^{F●}		NEX-F3 ^{F+●}	NEX-3N ^{F+●}	α5000 ^{F+●}												
DSLR-style		APS-C					_{m} α3000 ^{●}		_{m} α3500 ^{●}											
SmartShot		APS-C							QX1 ^{M●}											
CineAlta	Cine line	FF										VENICE				VENICE 2				
CineAlta	Cine line	FF																BURANO		
XDCAM	Cine line	FF												_{m} FX9						
XDCAM	Docu	S35							_{m} FS7		_{m} FS7 II									
XDCAM	Mobile	S35								_{m} FS5			_{m} FS5 II							
NXCAM	Pro	S35		NEX-FS100		NEX-FS700	NEX-FS700R													
NXCAM	APS-C					NEX-EA50														
Handycam	FF					_{m} NEX-VG900														
Handycam	APS-C		_{s} NEX-VG10		_{s} NEX-VG20	_{m} NEX-VG30														
Security		FF									SNC-VB770									
Security		FF									UMC-S3C									
Family	Level	Format																		
Family	Level	Format	'10	2011		2012	2013	2014	2015	2016	2017	2018	2019	2020	2021	2022	2023	2024	2025	2026
