= Sony α7R V =

2022 full-frame mirrorless camera

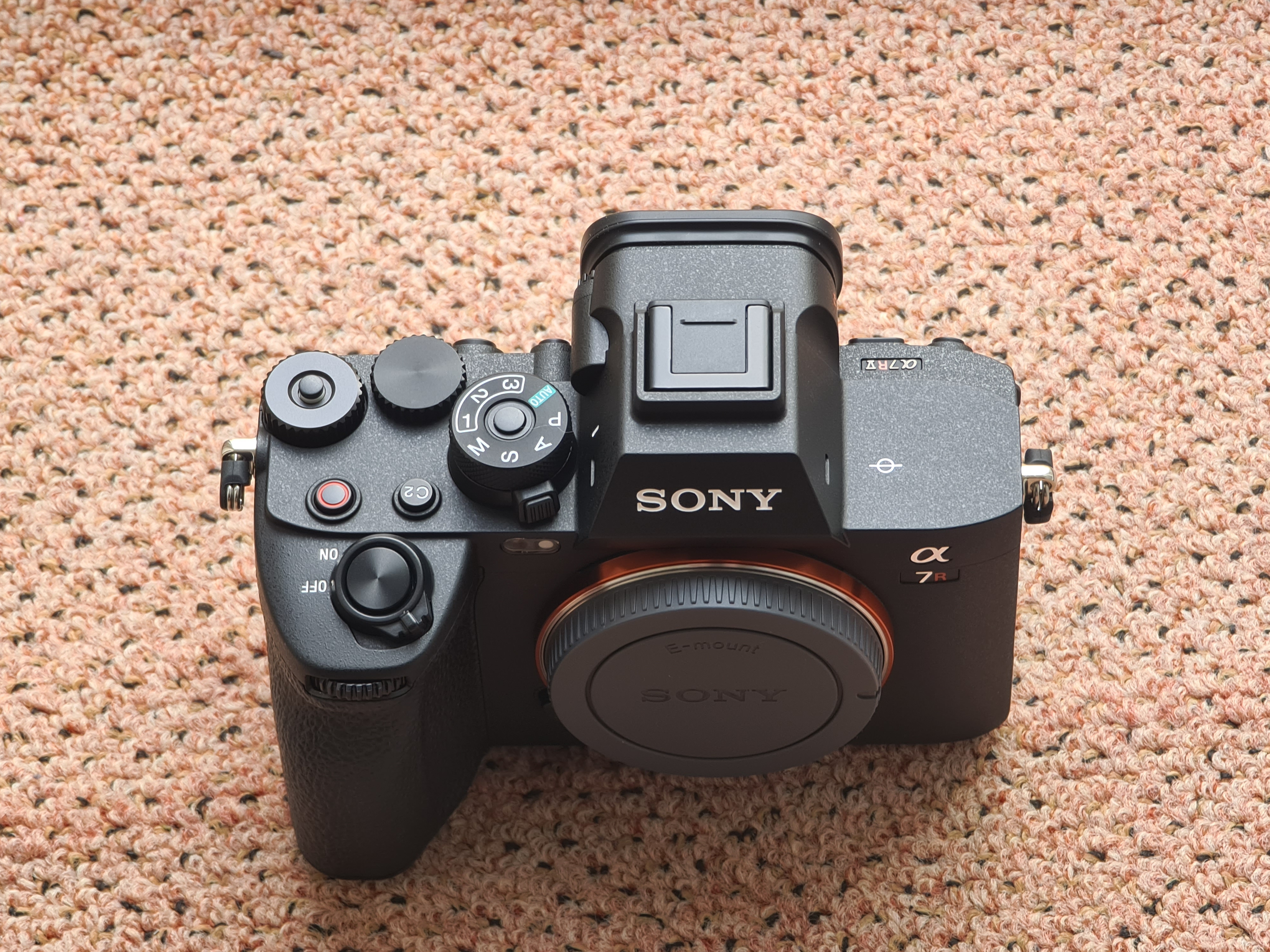

Overview
- Maker: Sony
- Released: December 2022
- Intro price: MSRP $3,900 (USD) £4,000 (GBP) 2022

Lens
- Lens mount: Sony E-mount

Sensor/medium
- Sensor type: BSI-CMOS
- Sensor size: 35.7 × 23.8 mm (full frame type)
- Maximum resolution: 9504 × 6336 (61 megapixels)
- Film speed: ISO 100–32000 (expandable to ISO 50–102400) (still images)
- Recording medium: SD, SDHC, or SDXC memory card supporting UHS-II bus, CFexpress Type A (dual slots)

Focusing
- Focus areas: 693 phase-detection focus points

Flash
- Flash: Via multi-interface hot shoe

Shutter
- Shutter speeds: 1/8000 s to 30 s, BULB
- Continuous shooting: 10 fps in JPEG or lossy compressed raw modes; 7 fps in higher quality raw modes

Viewfinder
- Viewfinder: EVF (electronic viewfinder)
- Optional viewfinders: 1.6 cm (0.64 type) (color), Quad-XGA OLED, 9.44m dot
- Viewfinder magnification: 0.9
- Frame coverage: 100%

Image processing
- Image processor: BIONZ XR
- White balance: Yes

General
- Video recording: 8K/24p or 4K/60p (both with 1.24x crop); full-width 4K up to 30p; 1080p120
- LCD screen: 76 mm (3 in) TFT with 1,440,000 dots
- Battery: NP-FZ100; Approx. 440 shots (Viewfinder)/approx. 530 shots (LCD monitor)
- Body features: In-body Image Stabillization
- Weight: 723 g (26 oz) with battery and SD card

Chronology
- Replaced: Sony α7R IV
- Successor: Sony α7R VI

The Sony α7R V (model ILCE-7RM5) is a full-frame mirrorless interchangeable-lens camera manufactured by Sony. It was announced in October 2022 as the successor to the Sony α7R IV launched 2.5 years prior.

== Image gallery ==
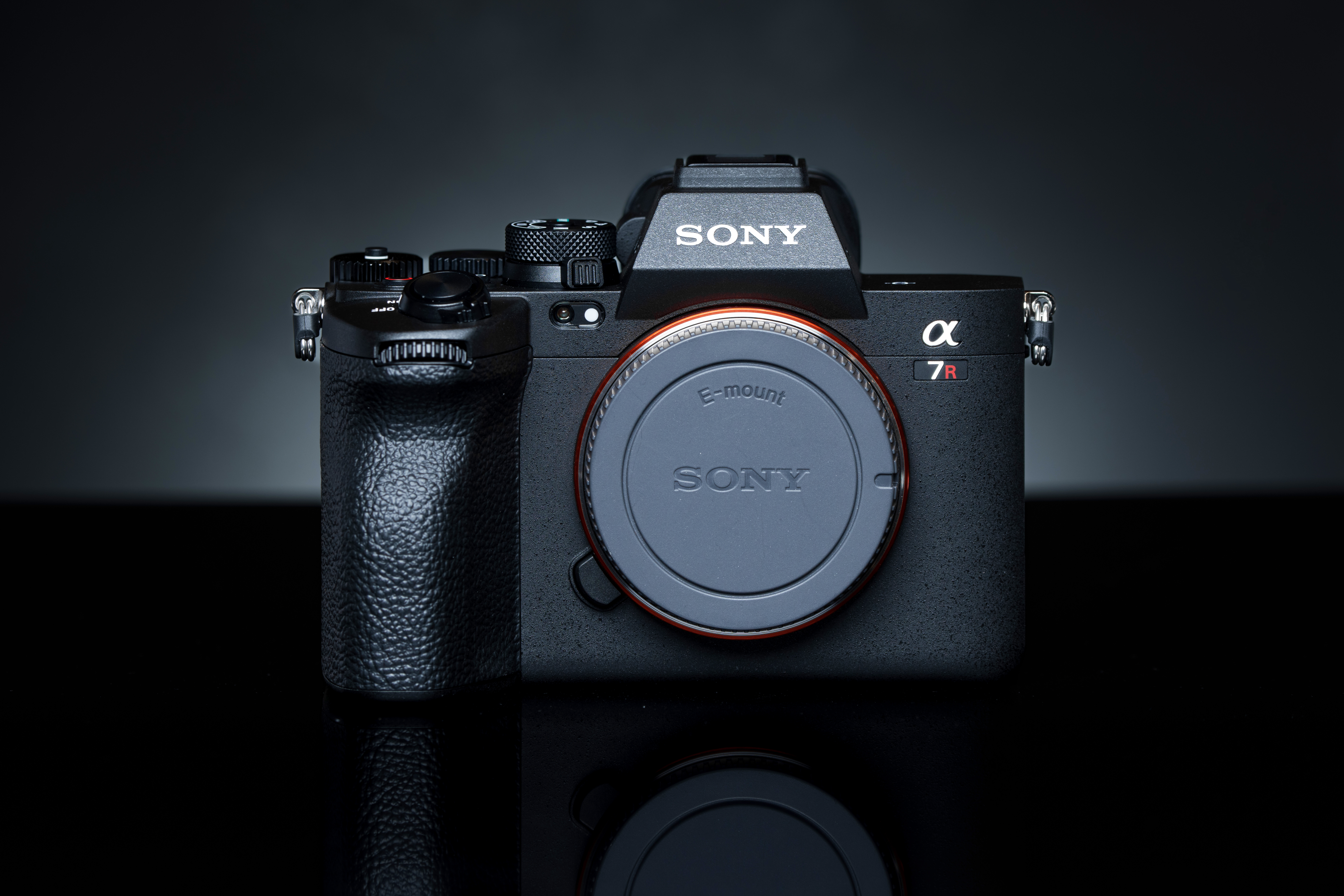
Front view

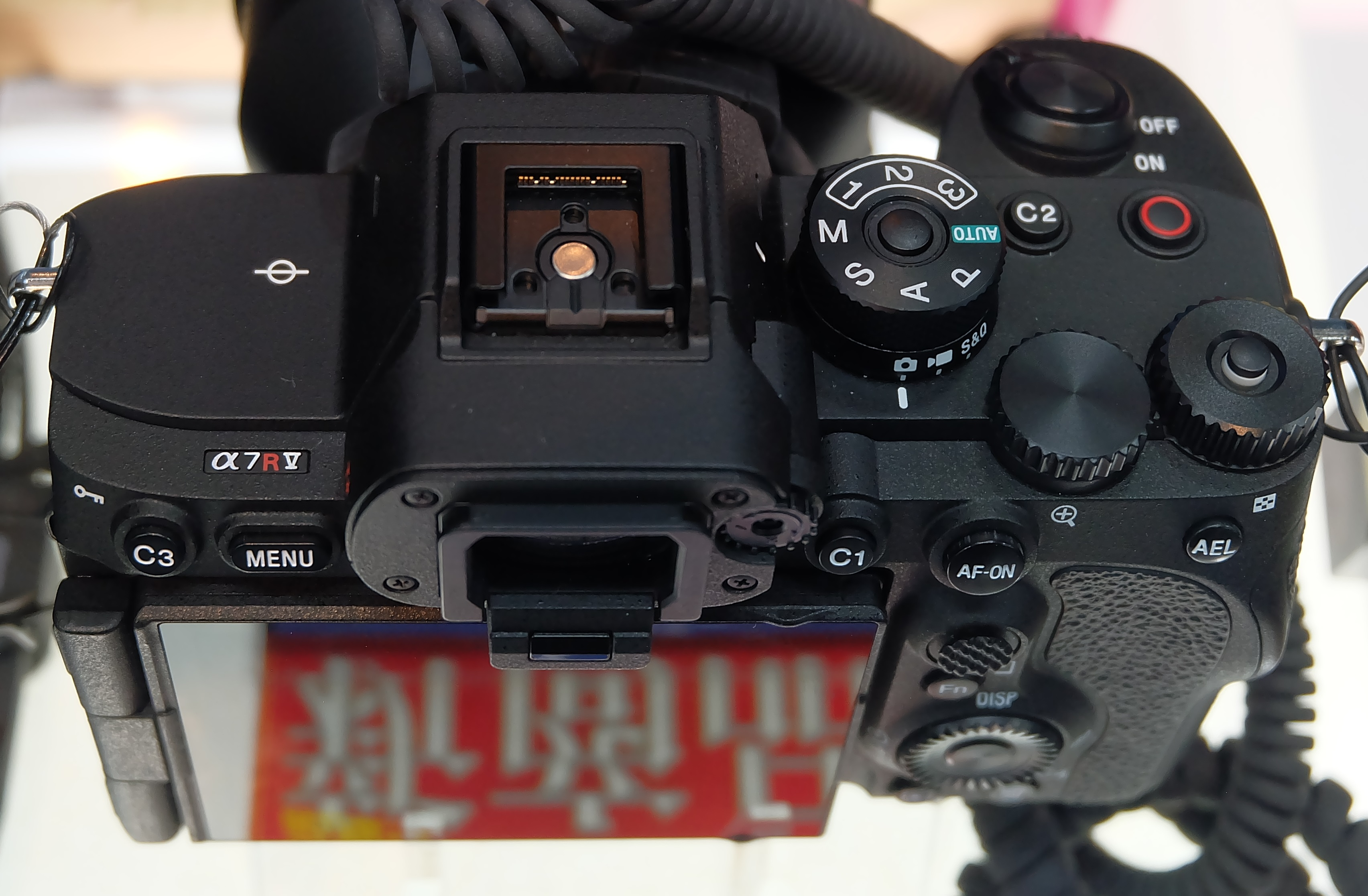
Rear and top view

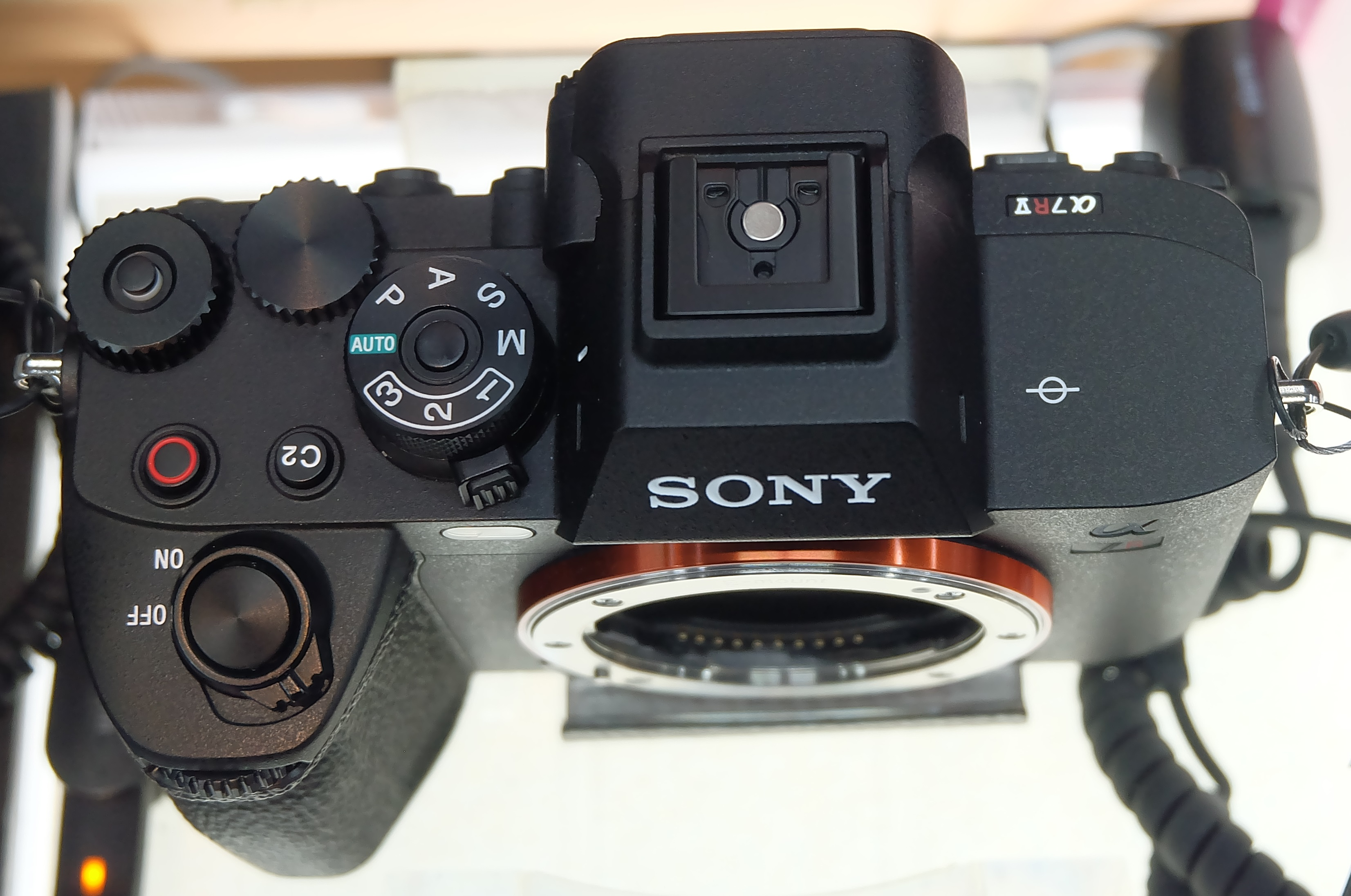
Front and top view

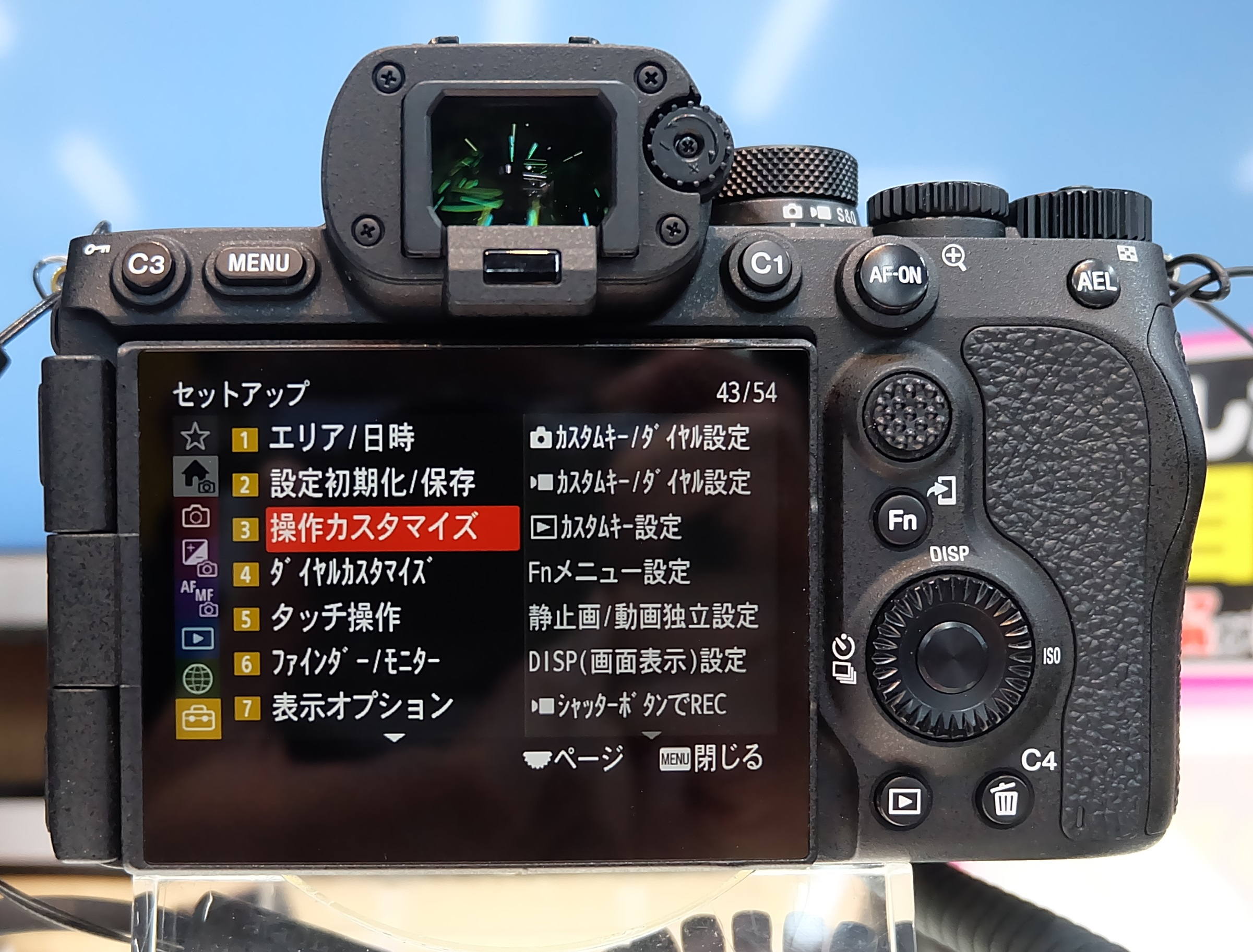
Rear view

== Notable appearances in media ==
A Sony α7R V is used by Kirsten Dunst's character (Lee Smith) in the 2024 film Civil War, directed by Alex Garland.

== See also ==
- Comparison of Sony α7 cameras

| Family | Level | Format | '10 | 2011 | | 2012 | 2013 | 2014 | 2015 | 2016 | 2017 | 2018 | 2019 | 2020 | 2021 | 2022 | 2023 | 2024 | 2025 | 2026 |
|---|---|---|---|---|---|---|---|---|---|---|---|---|---|---|---|---|---|---|---|---|
| Alpha (α) | Indust | FF | | | | | | | | | | | | | | | | ILX-LR1 ^{●} | | |
| Alpha (α) | Cine line | FF | | | | | | | | | | | | | _{m} FX6 ^{●} | | | | | |
| Alpha (α) | Cine line | FF | | | | | | | | | | | | | _{m} FX3 ^{AT●} | | | | | |
| Alpha (α) | Cine line | FF | | | | | | | | | | | | | | | | | | _{m} FX2 ^{AT●} |
| Alpha (α) | Flag | FF | | | | | | | | | | | | | _{m} α1 ^{FT●} | | | | _{m} α1 II ^{FAT●} | |
| Alpha (α) | Speed | FF | | | | | | | | | | _{m} α9 ^{FT●} | | | _{m} α9 II ^{FT●} | | | | _{m} α9 III ^{FAT●} | |
| Alpha (α) | Sens | FF | | | | | | | _{m} α7S ^{●} | _{m} α7S II ^{F●} | | | | | _{m} α7S III ^{AT●} | | | | | |
| Alpha (α) | Hi-Res | FF | | | | | | _{m} α7R ^{●} | | _{m} α7R II ^{F●} | | _{m} α7R III ^{FT●} | | _{m} α7R IV ^{FT●} | | | _{m} α7R V ^{FAT●} | | | |
| Alpha (α) | Basic | FF | | | | | | _{m} α7 ^{F●} | _{m} α7 II ^{F●} | | | | _{m} α7 III ^{FT●} | | | _{m} α7 IV ^{AT●} | | | | _{m} α7 V ^{FAT●} |
| Alpha (α) | Compact | FF | | | | | | | | | | | | | | | | _{m} α7CR ^{AT●} | | |
| Alpha (α) | Compact | FF | | | | | | | | | | | | | _{m} α7C ^{AT●} | | | _{m} α7C II ^{AT●} | | |
| Alpha (α) | Vlog | FF | | | | | | | | | | | | | | | | _{m} ZV-E1 ^{AT●} | | |
| Alpha (α) | Cine | APS-C | | | | | | | | | | | | | | | _{m} FX30 ^{AT●} | | | |
| Alpha (α) | Adv | APS-C | | | _{s} NEX-7 ^{F●} | | | | | | _{m} α6500 ^{FT●} | | | _{m} α6600 ^{FT●} | | | | _{m} α6700 ^{AT●} | | |
| Alpha (α) | Mid-range | APS-C | | | | _{m} NEX-6 ^{F●} | | | | | _{m} α6300 ^{F●} | | _{m} α6400 ^{F+T●} | | | | | | | |
| Alpha (α) | Mid-range | APS-C | | | | | | _{m} α6000 ^{F●} | | | | | | _{m} α6100 ^{FT●} | | | | | | |
| Alpha (α) | Vlog | APS-C | | | | | | | | | | | | | | _{m} ZV-E10 ^{AT●} | | | _{m} ZV-E10 II ^{AT●} | |
| Alpha (α) | Entry-level | APS-C | NEX-5 ^{F●} | NEX-5N ^{FT●} | | NEX-5R ^{F+T●} | NEX-5T ^{F+T●} | | α5100 ^{F+T●} | | | | | | | | | | | |
| Alpha (α) | Entry-level | APS-C | NEX-3 ^{F●} | NEX-C3 ^{F●} | | NEX-F3 ^{F+●} | NEX-3N ^{F+●} | α5000 ^{F+●} | | | | | | | | | | | | |
| DSLR-style | | APS-C | | | | | _{m} α3000 ^{●} | | _{m} α3500 ^{●} | | | | | | | | | | | |
| SmartShot | | APS-C | | | | | | | QX1 ^{M●} | | | | | | | | | | | |
| CineAlta | Cine line | FF | | | | | | | | | | VENICE | | | | VENICE 2 | | | | |
| CineAlta | Cine line | FF | | | | | | | | | | | | | | | | BURANO | | |
| XDCAM | Cine line | FF | | | | | | | | | | | | _{m} FX9 | | | | | | |
| XDCAM | Docu | S35 | | | | | | | _{m} FS7 | | _{m} FS7 II | | | | | | | | | |
| XDCAM | Mobile | S35 | | | | | | | | _{m} FS5 | | | _{m} FS5 II | | | | | | | |
| NXCAM | Pro | S35 | | NEX-FS100 | | NEX-FS700 | NEX-FS700R | | | | | | | | | | | | | |
| NXCAM | APS-C | | | | | NEX-EA50 | | | | | | | | | | | | | | |
| Handycam | FF | | | | | _{m} NEX-VG900 | | | | | | | | | | | | | | |
| Handycam | APS-C | | _{s} NEX-VG10 | | _{s} NEX-VG20 | _{m} NEX-VG30 | | | | | | | | | | | | | | |
| Security | | FF | | | | | | | | | SNC-VB770 | | | | | | | | | |
| Security | | FF | | | | | | | | | UMC-S3C | | | | | | | | | |
| Family | Level | Format | | | | | | | | | | | | | | | | | | |
| Family | Level | Format | '10 | 2011 | | 2012 | 2013 | 2014 | 2015 | 2016 | 2017 | 2018 | 2019 | 2020 | 2021 | 2022 | 2023 | 2024 | 2025 | 2026 |
