= WARC =

WARC may refer to:

- WARC (FM), a radio station (90.3 FM) licensed to Meadville, Pennsylvania, United States
- Warren Ashby Residential College at Mary Foust Hall, a living-learning community located on the campus of The University of North Carolina at Greensboro
- WARC (file format), an ISO standard for web archiving
- West African Research Center
- World Administrative Radio Conference
  - WARC bands, the world-wide amateur radio bands allocated during the above conference
- World Alliance of Reformed Churches
- The final call letters briefly used by radio station WGI at Medford Hillside, Massachusetts.
- WARC (marketing business), a digital marketing business acquired by Ascential
