= Sony α1 =

2021 full-frame mirrorless camera

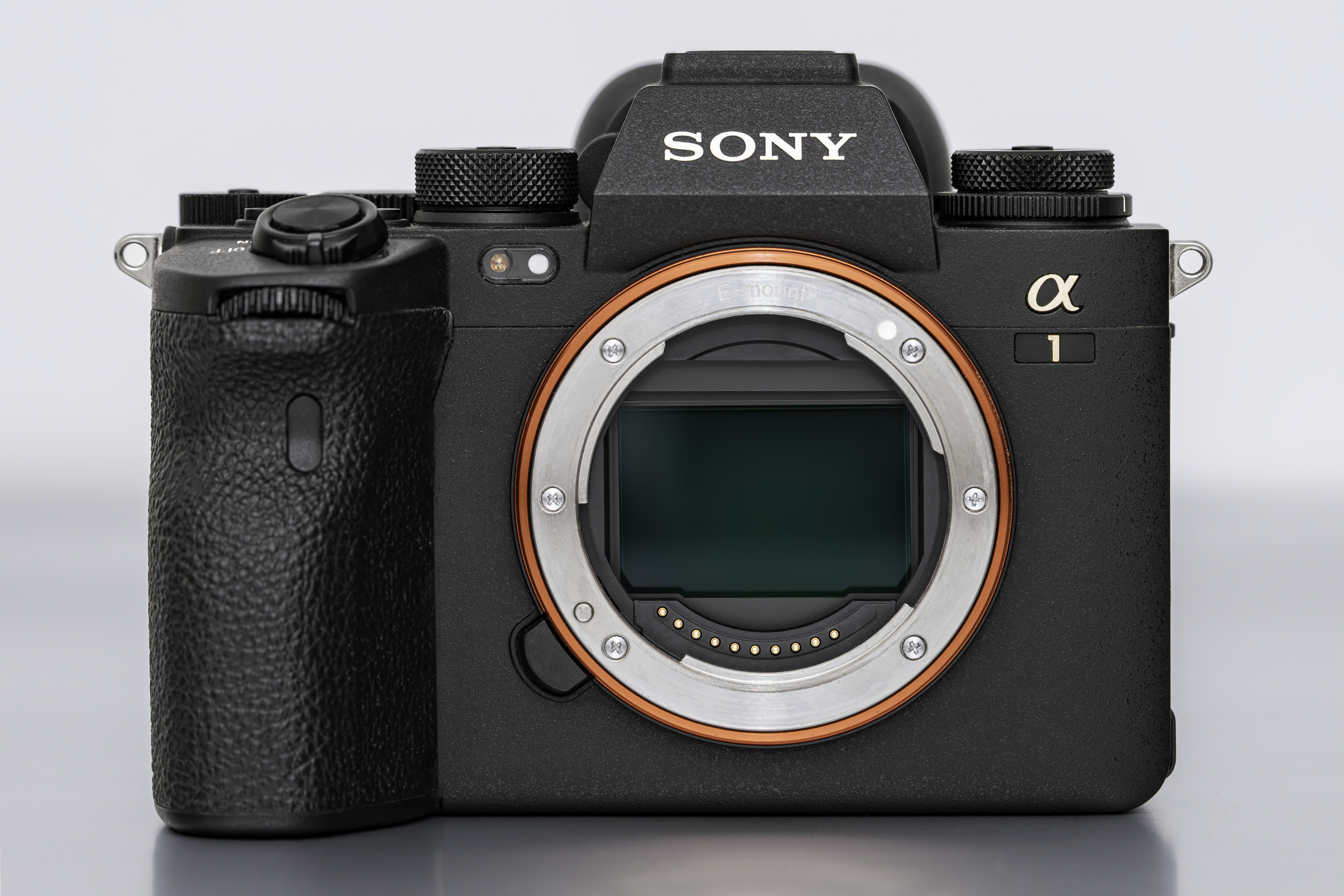

Overview
- Maker: Sony
- Type: Full Frame MILC
- Released: January 27, 2021; 4 years ago
- Intro price: USD 6,495 (body)

Lens
- Lens mount: Sony E-mount
- Lens: Interchangeable lens

Sensor/medium
- Sensor: Full Frame
- Sensor type: Exmor RS CMOS
- Sensor size: 35.9 × 24.0 mm Full Frame
- Sensor maker: Sony
- Maximum resolution: 50.1 megapixels 8640 × 5760
- Film speed: ISO 100–32000, ISO 50 to 102400
- Storage media: Dual Slot CFexpress Type A, SD, SDHC, SDXC; UHS-II, UHS-I

Flash
- Flash: External flash
- Flash synchronization: 1/400s (1/500s APS-C)
- Compatible flashes: Shoe Mount flash

Shutter
- Shutter: Electronically controlled, vertical-traverse, focal-plane type
- Shutter speeds: 1/8000 to 30 seconds, bulb
- Continuous shooting: 30.0 fps

Viewfinder
- Viewfinder: EVF with eye sensor
- Electronic viewfinder: 0.64" 9.4M dots OLED Viewfinder
- Viewfinder magnification: 0.9
- Frame coverage: 100%

Image processing
- Image processor: BIONZ XR

General
- Video recording: XAVC S, XAVC HS; 8K up to 30 fps, 4K up to 120 fps, 1080p up to 120 fps
- LCD screen: 3.0" 1.44M dots touchscreen variable-angle monitor
- Battery: NP-FZ100 Li-ion
- AV port(s): HDMI A, ⌀3.5 mm audio jack
- Data port(s): USB C 3.2, LAN, Wi-Fi 5, Bluetooth 5.0
- Body features: Magnesium Alloy Body, Active Mode optical image stabilization, Image Sensor-Shift, Anti-Dust System
- Dimensions: 128.9 mm × 96.9 mm × 80.8 mm (5.07 in × 3.81 in × 3.18 in)
- Weight: 737 g (26 oz) (1.625 lb) including battery and memory card
- Latest firmware: 3.01 / 15 April 2025; 9 months ago
- Made in: Thailand

Chronology
- Successor: Sony α1 II

The Sony α1 (model ILCE-1) is a full-frame mirrorless interchangeable-lens camera by Sony that was announced on January 27, 2021. The α1 was announced together with the Xperia Pro smartphone, which can be used as an HDR monitor and a 5G transmitter. The camera became available in March 2021 starting at US$6500 and is aimed at professional photographers and videographers, covering wildlife, sports, action and landscape.

Its successor, the Sony α1 II, was released in December 2024.

== Features ==
- New 50.1MP Exmor RS stacked BSI CMOS sensor
- 30.0 fps shooting with 165 JPEG image buffer (or 155 compressed RAW)
- 120 times per second AF and AE calculation
- Improved electronic shutter with 1.5× less rolling shutter
- 5-axis in-body image stabilization
- 8K30p and 4K120p video
- 240 Hz OLED electronic viewfinder
- Expanded ISO 50–102,400
- Multi Interface Shoe with digital audio interface
- New heat dissipation structure for >30 minute 8K30p/4k60p recording
- Improved dust and moisture resistance

== See also ==
- List of Sony E-mount cameras
- Sony α9

Family	Level	Format	'10	2011		2012	2013	2014	2015	2016	2017	2018	2019	2020	2021	2022	2023	2024	2025	2026
Alpha (α)	Indust	FF																ILX-LR1 ^{●}		
Alpha (α)	Cine line	FF													_{m} FX6 ^{●}					
Alpha (α)	Cine line	FF													_{m} FX3 ^{AT●}					
Alpha (α)	Cine line	FF																		_{m} FX2 ^{AT●}
Alpha (α)	Flag	FF													_{m} α1 ^{FT●}				_{m} α1 II ^{FAT●}	
Alpha (α)	Speed	FF										_{m} α9 ^{FT●}			_{m} α9 II ^{FT●}				_{m} α9 III ^{FAT●}	
Alpha (α)	Sens	FF							_{m} α7S ^{●}	_{m} α7S II ^{F●}					_{m} α7S III ^{AT●}					
Alpha (α)	Hi-Res	FF						_{m} α7R ^{●}		_{m} α7R II ^{F●}		_{m} α7R III ^{FT●}		_{m} α7R IV ^{FT●}			_{m} α7R V ^{FAT●}			
Alpha (α)	Basic	FF						_{m} α7 ^{F●}	_{m} α7 II ^{F●}				_{m} α7 III ^{FT●}			_{m} α7 IV ^{AT●}				_{m} α7 V ^{FAT●}
Alpha (α)	Compact	FF																_{m} α7CR ^{AT●}		
Alpha (α)	Compact	FF													_{m} α7C ^{AT●}			_{m} α7C II ^{AT●}		
Alpha (α)	Vlog	FF																_{m} ZV-E1 ^{AT●}		
Alpha (α)	Cine	APS-C															_{m} FX30 ^{AT●}			
Alpha (α)	Adv	APS-C			_{s} NEX-7 ^{F●}						_{m} α6500 ^{FT●}			_{m} α6600 ^{FT●}				_{m} α6700 ^{AT●}		
Alpha (α)	Mid-range	APS-C				_{m} NEX-6 ^{F●}					_{m} α6300 ^{F●}		_{m} α6400 ^{F+T●}							
Alpha (α)	Mid-range	APS-C						_{m} α6000 ^{F●}						_{m} α6100 ^{FT●}						
Alpha (α)	Vlog	APS-C														_{m} ZV-E10 ^{AT●}			_{m} ZV-E10 II ^{AT●}	
Alpha (α)	Entry-level	APS-C	NEX-5 ^{F●}	NEX-5N ^{FT●}		NEX-5R ^{F+T●}	NEX-5T ^{F+T●}		α5100 ^{F+T●}											
Alpha (α)	Entry-level	APS-C	NEX-3 ^{F●}	NEX-C3 ^{F●}		NEX-F3 ^{F+●}	NEX-3N ^{F+●}	α5000 ^{F+●}												
DSLR-style		APS-C					_{m} α3000 ^{●}		_{m} α3500 ^{●}											
SmartShot		APS-C							QX1 ^{M●}											
CineAlta	Cine line	FF										VENICE				VENICE 2				
CineAlta	Cine line	FF																BURANO		
XDCAM	Cine line	FF												_{m} FX9						
XDCAM	Docu	S35							_{m} FS7		_{m} FS7 II									
XDCAM	Mobile	S35								_{m} FS5			_{m} FS5 II							
NXCAM	Pro	S35		NEX-FS100		NEX-FS700	NEX-FS700R													
NXCAM	APS-C					NEX-EA50														
Handycam	FF					_{m} NEX-VG900														
Handycam	APS-C		_{s} NEX-VG10		_{s} NEX-VG20	_{m} NEX-VG30														
Security		FF									SNC-VB770									
Security		FF									UMC-S3C									
Family	Level	Format																		
Family	Level	Format	'10	2011		2012	2013	2014	2015	2016	2017	2018	2019	2020	2021	2022	2023	2024	2025	2026
