= Sony α7R IV =

2019 full-frame mirrorless camera

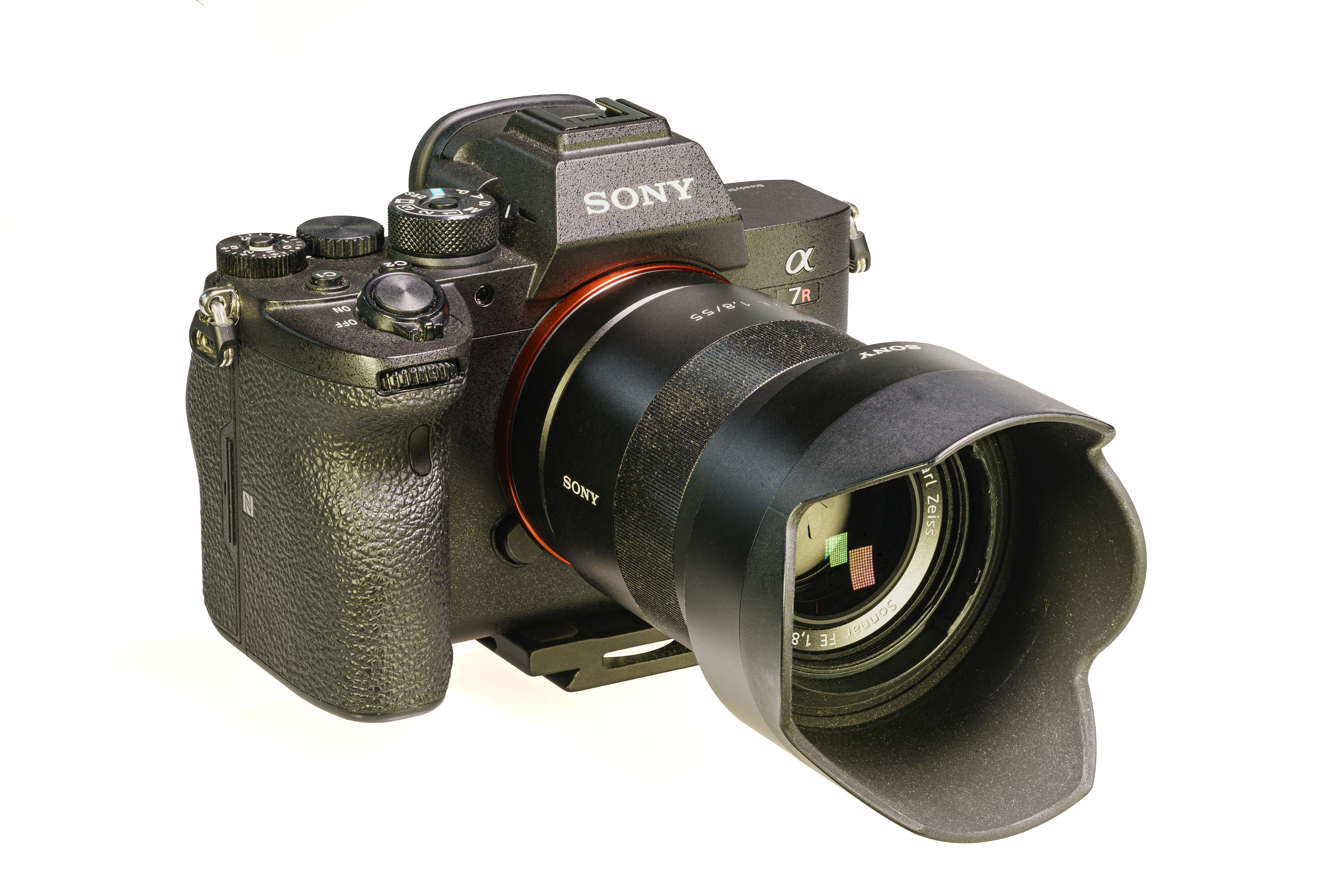
- Sony α7R IV with Sony Carl Zeiss Sonnar T* FE 55mm F1.8 ZA lens

Overview
- Maker: Sony
- Released: 2019-07-16
- Intro price: MSRP $3,499 (USD) £2,239.00 (GBP) 2019

Lens
- Lens mount: Sony E-mount

Sensor/medium
- Sensor type: BSI-CMOS
- Sensor size: 35.7 × 23.8 mm (Full frame type)
- Maximum resolution: 9504 × 6336 (61 megapixels)
- Film speed: ISO 100–32000 (expandable to ISO 50–102400) (still images)
- Recording medium: SD, SDHC, or SDXC memory card (dual slots, both supporting UHS-II bus)

Focusing
- Focus areas: 567 phase-detection focus points 425 contrast-detection focus points

Flash
- Flash: Via Multi-interface hot shoe

Shutter
- Shutter speeds: 1/8000 s to 30 s, BULB
- Continuous shooting: HI 8fps Uncompressed RAW or HI+ 10 fps in Compressed RAW (35/71 shot buffer for Full Frame and APS-C mode)

Viewfinder
- Viewfinder: EVF (Electronic Viewfinder) 1.3 cm, 1600 × 1200 UXGA OLED, 5.76m dot
- Viewfinder magnification: 0.78×
- Frame coverage: 100%

Image processing
- Image processor: BIONZ X
- White balance: Yes

General
- Video recording: 4K video up to 30 fps
- LCD screen: 76 mm (3 in) TFT with 1,440,000 dots
- Battery: NP-FZ100; Approx. 530 shots (Viewfinder)/approx. 670 shots (LCD monitor)
- Body features: In-body Image Stabillization
- Weight: 665 g (23 oz) with battery and SD card
- Made in: Thailand

Chronology
- Replaced: Sony α7R III
- Successor: Sony α7R V

The Sony α7R IV (model ILCE-7RM4) is a full-frame mirrorless interchangeable-lens camera manufactured by Sony. It was announced on 16 July 2019 as the successor to the Sony α7R III launched two years prior.

== Image gallery ==
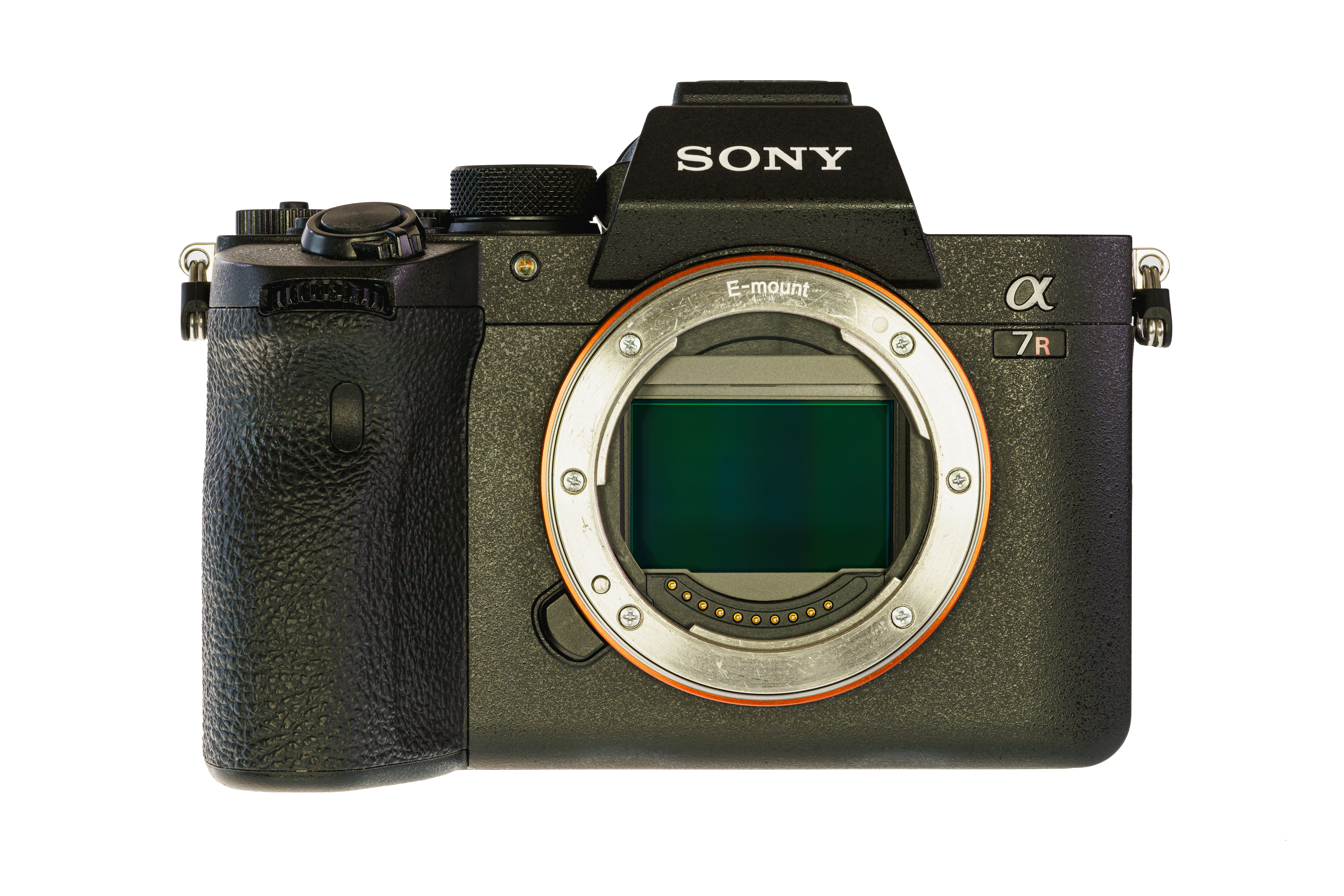
Front view

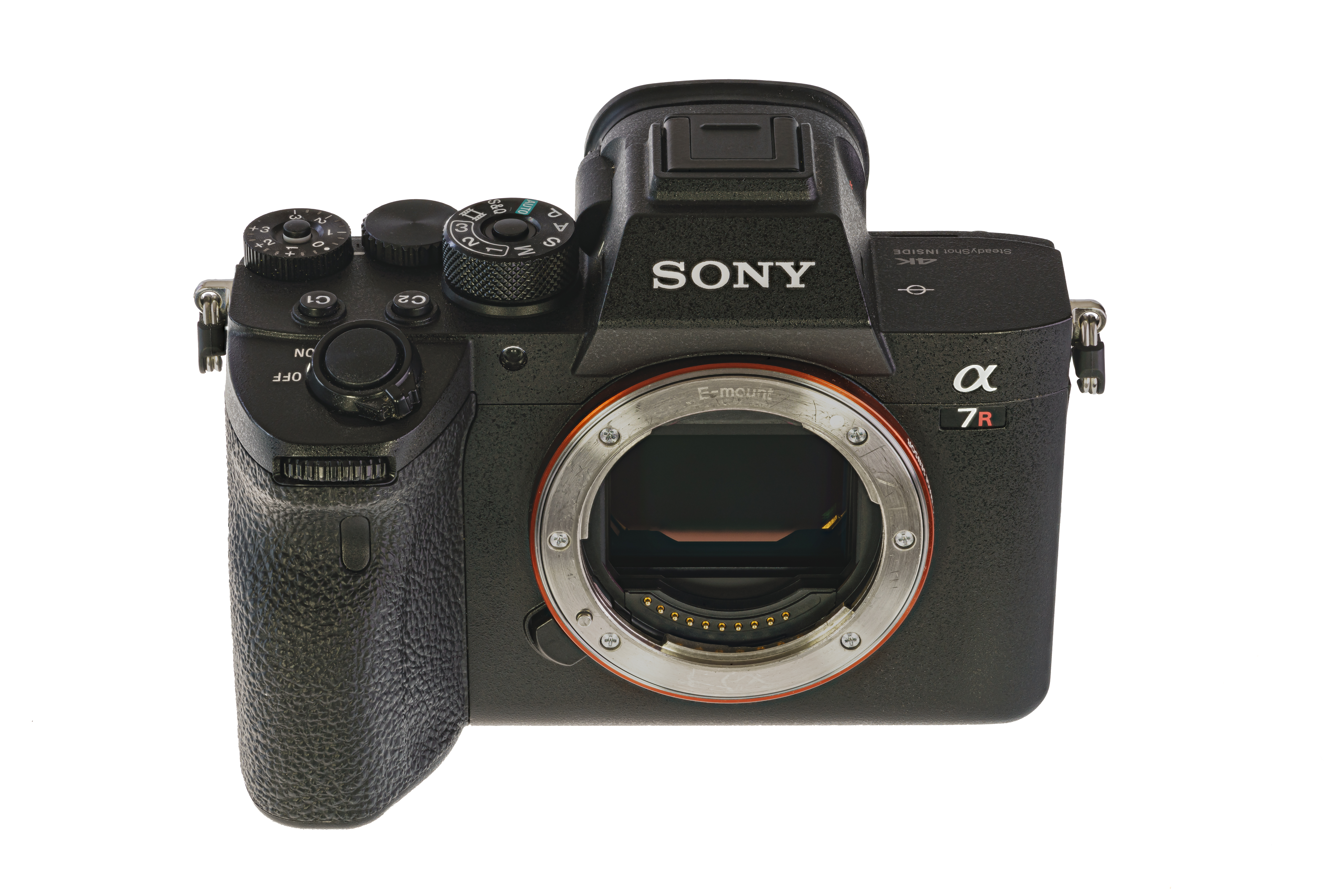
Elevated front view

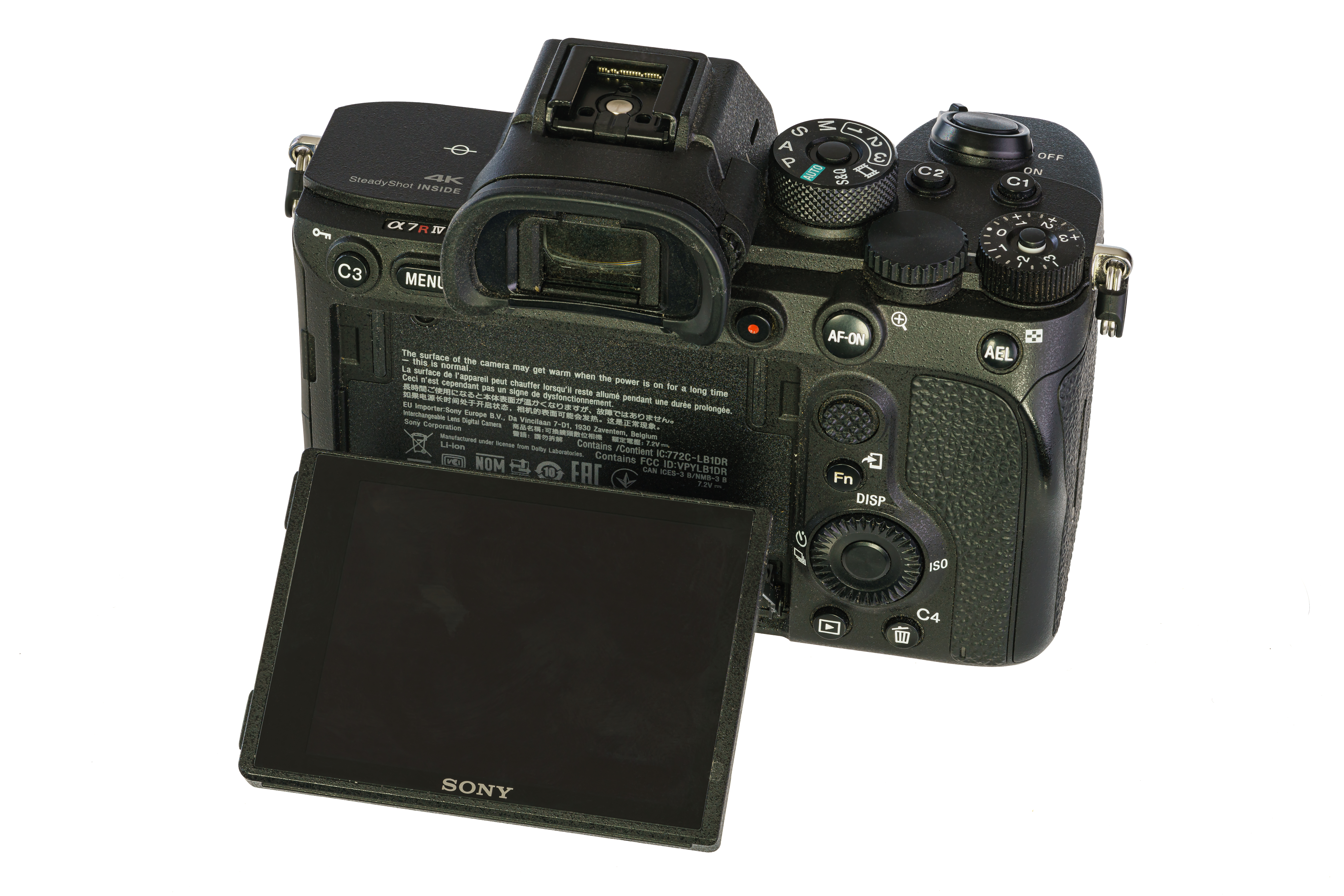
The rear view shows the revamped control units

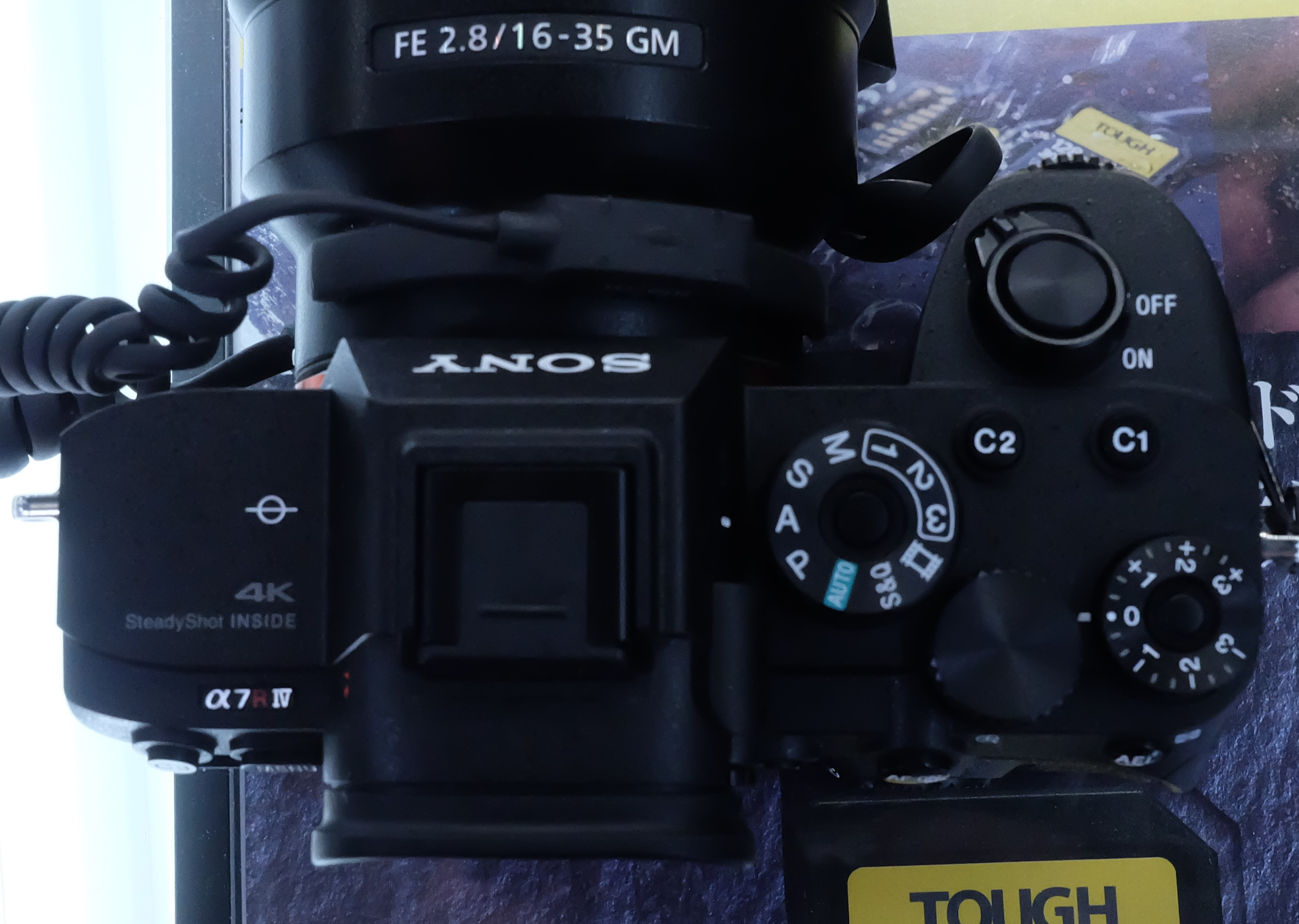
Top view

== Features ==
The Sony α7R IV improved upon the earlier Sony α7R III in several notable ways:

- Increased sensor resolution, from 42.4 megapixels to 61.0 megapixels
- Increased Phase Detect Autofocus points, from 399 to 567 while maintaining the same 425 Contrast Detect Autofocus points
- Increased the number of images pixel shift uses, from a maximum of 4 to a maximum of 16
- Both memory card slots are UHS-II
- Eye Autofocus is available in video mode
- Better ergonomics in the camera body, specifically with regard to the hand grip, exposure compensation dial, and weather sealing

== Awards ==
The α7R IV won 2020 Camera of The Year, and Readers Award in the Japanese Camera Press Club's Camera Grand Prix.

== See also ==
- Comparison of Sony α7 cameras
- Sony α9
- Exmor R

Family	Level	Format	'10	2011		2012	2013	2014	2015	2016	2017	2018	2019	2020	2021	2022	2023	2024	2025	2026
Alpha (α)	Indust	FF																ILX-LR1 ^{●}		
Alpha (α)	Cine line	FF													_{m} FX6 ^{●}					
Alpha (α)	Cine line	FF													_{m} FX3 ^{AT●}					
Alpha (α)	Cine line	FF																		_{m} FX2 ^{AT●}
Alpha (α)	Flag	FF													_{m} α1 ^{FT●}				_{m} α1 II ^{FAT●}	
Alpha (α)	Speed	FF										_{m} α9 ^{FT●}			_{m} α9 II ^{FT●}				_{m} α9 III ^{FAT●}	
Alpha (α)	Sens	FF							_{m} α7S ^{●}	_{m} α7S II ^{F●}					_{m} α7S III ^{AT●}					
Alpha (α)	Hi-Res	FF						_{m} α7R ^{●}		_{m} α7R II ^{F●}		_{m} α7R III ^{FT●}		_{m} α7R IV ^{FT●}			_{m} α7R V ^{FAT●}			
Alpha (α)	Basic	FF						_{m} α7 ^{F●}	_{m} α7 II ^{F●}				_{m} α7 III ^{FT●}			_{m} α7 IV ^{AT●}				_{m} α7 V ^{FAT●}
Alpha (α)	Compact	FF																_{m} α7CR ^{AT●}		
Alpha (α)	Compact	FF													_{m} α7C ^{AT●}			_{m} α7C II ^{AT●}		
Alpha (α)	Vlog	FF																_{m} ZV-E1 ^{AT●}		
Alpha (α)	Cine	APS-C															_{m} FX30 ^{AT●}			
Alpha (α)	Adv	APS-C			_{s} NEX-7 ^{F●}						_{m} α6500 ^{FT●}			_{m} α6600 ^{FT●}				_{m} α6700 ^{AT●}		
Alpha (α)	Mid-range	APS-C				_{m} NEX-6 ^{F●}					_{m} α6300 ^{F●}		_{m} α6400 ^{F+T●}							
Alpha (α)	Mid-range	APS-C						_{m} α6000 ^{F●}						_{m} α6100 ^{FT●}						
Alpha (α)	Vlog	APS-C														_{m} ZV-E10 ^{AT●}			_{m} ZV-E10 II ^{AT●}	
Alpha (α)	Entry-level	APS-C	NEX-5 ^{F●}	NEX-5N ^{FT●}		NEX-5R ^{F+T●}	NEX-5T ^{F+T●}		α5100 ^{F+T●}											
Alpha (α)	Entry-level	APS-C	NEX-3 ^{F●}	NEX-C3 ^{F●}		NEX-F3 ^{F+●}	NEX-3N ^{F+●}	α5000 ^{F+●}												
DSLR-style		APS-C					_{m} α3000 ^{●}		_{m} α3500 ^{●}											
SmartShot		APS-C							QX1 ^{M●}											
CineAlta	Cine line	FF										VENICE				VENICE 2				
CineAlta	Cine line	FF																BURANO		
XDCAM	Cine line	FF												_{m} FX9						
XDCAM	Docu	S35							_{m} FS7		_{m} FS7 II									
XDCAM	Mobile	S35								_{m} FS5			_{m} FS5 II							
NXCAM	Pro	S35		NEX-FS100		NEX-FS700	NEX-FS700R													
NXCAM	APS-C					NEX-EA50														
Handycam	FF					_{m} NEX-VG900														
Handycam	APS-C		_{s} NEX-VG10		_{s} NEX-VG20	_{m} NEX-VG30														
Security		FF									SNC-VB770									
Security		FF									UMC-S3C									
Family	Level	Format																		
Family	Level	Format	'10	2011		2012	2013	2014	2015	2016	2017	2018	2019	2020	2021	2022	2023	2024	2025	2026
