= Leica SL3 =

2024 full-frame mirrorless camera

Overview
- Maker: Leica
- Type: Mirrorless full-frame system camera
- Released: 7 March 2024

Lens
- Lens mount: Leica L mount

Sensor/medium
- Sensor type: CMOS
- Sensor size: 36 mm × 24 mm (1.42 in × 0.94 in)
- Maximum resolution: 9520 × 6336 (60.3 MP)
- Film speed: ISO 50 to 100000 (manual)
- Recording medium: Photo: DNG + JPG up to 9520 × 6336 (60.3 MP); Video: MP4/MOV (H.264/H.265) and ProRes (see vidrecord)
- Storage media: SD/SDHC/SDXC (UHS-I/UHS-II) + CFexpress Type B

Focusing
- Focus: Hybrid AF (phase/contrast/depth map)
- Focus modes: Intelligent AF, AFs, AFc; touch AF optional; 315 AF areas

Exposure/metering
- Exposure: TTL (Through The Lens exposure metering)
- Exposure modes: P / A / S / M
- Exposure metering: Spot, center-weighted, highlight-weighted, multi-field

Flash
- Flash: Built-in hot shoe
- Flash synchronization: Up to 1/200 s

Shutter
- Shutter: Electronically controlled focal-plane shutter / electronic shutter
- Shutter speeds: Mechanical: 60 min to 1/8000 s; Electronic: 60 s to 1/16000 s
- Continuous shooting: Up to 15 fps (electronic shutter; depending on AF/exposure mode)

Viewfinder
- Viewfinder: 5,760,000 dots, 60/120 fps; 0.76× (3:2) / 0.78× (4:3); 100% coverage
- Viewfinder magnification: 0.76× (3:2) / 0.78× (4:3)
- Frame coverage: 100%

Image processing
- Image processor: Leica Maestro IV

Projector

General
- Video recording: Up to C8K (8192 × 4320) / 8K (7680 × 4320); up to C4K/4K 59.94/50 fps; Full HD (1920 × 1080)
- LCD screen: 3.2" touchscreen, 2,332,800 dots
- AV port(s): HDMI 2.1 Type A; 3.5 mm audio out / 3.5 mm audio in
- Data port: USB 3.1 Gen1 Type-C
- Body features: All-metal magnesium/aluminum housing; IP54 splash-water protection
- Dimensions: 141.2 mm × 108 mm × 84.6 mm (5.56 in × 4.25 in × 3.33 in)
- Weight: 769 g (27.1 oz) (without battery, SD card, bayonet cover)
- Made in: Germany

The Leica SL3 is a full-frame mirrorless interchangeable-lens camera released by Leica Camera on 7 March 2024. The camera uses the Leica L-Mount lenses range and is part of the L-Mount Alliance of camera bodies that Leica co-developed with Panasonic and Sigma.

The SL3 has a 60.3-megapixel full-frame CMOS sensor with 5-axis in-body image stabilization and is powered by the Leica Maestro IV processor. It introduces a hybrid autofocus system combining phase-detection, contrast detection, and depth-map methods, with 315 AF areas and subject-detection modes. The SL3 features dual card slots (SD UHS-II and CFexpress Type B), an IP54-rated weather-sealed metal body, and an OLED electronic viewfinder rated at 5.76 million dots (up to 120 fps). Video recording includes 8K and C8K capture, with MOV/MP4 support including H.264/H.265 and ProRes options depending on settings and modes.

The Leica SL3 succeeds the Leica SL2.

== SL3-P ==
In June 2026, Leica released the SL3-P, featuring a 44-megapixel back-illuminated full-frame sensor, an 819-point hybrid autofocus system and continuous shooting at up to 40 frames per second with autofocus. The camera can record 8.1K open-gate video and 8K video at up to 30 frames per second, while its multishot mode produces images with a resolution of up to 176 megapixels. It also supports the Content Authenticity Initiative's Content Credentials system for attaching tamper-evident provenance information to images.
