= Sony FE 50mm F2.8 Macro =

- Maker: Sony
- Lens mount(s): Sony E-mount

Technical data
- Type: Prime
- Focal length: 50mm
- Image format: 35mm full-frame
- Aperture (max/min): f/2.8 (22)
- Close focus distance: 0.28 metres (0.92 ft)
- Max. magnification: 1:1 (1×)
- Diaphragm blades: 7 blades
- Construction: 8 elements in 8 groups

Features
- Manual focus override: Yes Yes
- Weather-sealing: Yes Yes
- Lens-based stabilization: No No
- Macro capable: Yes Yes
- Aperture ring: No No
- Unique features: dedicated macro lens, extra-low dispersion glass
- Application: portrait, macro

Physical
- Min. length: 71 millimetres (2.8 in)
- Diameter: 71 millimetres (2.8 in)
- Weight: 236 grams (0.520 lb)
- Filter diameter: 55mm
- Color: black

Software
- Lens ID: 3

History
- Introduction: 2016

Retail info
- MSRP: $499 USD (as of 2016)

The Sony FE 50mm F2.8 Macro is a full-frame macro prime lens for the Sony E-mount, announced by Sony on August 30, 2016.

As of June 2017, the 50mm Macro lens is one of only 3 E-mount lenses manufactured by Sony that are specifically designed for macro photography, with the others being the Sony E 30mm F3.5 Macro and Sony FE 90mm F2.8 Macro G OSS lenses. Though designed for Sony's full frame E-mount cameras, this lens can be used on Sony's APS-C E-mount camera bodies, producing a field-of-view equivalent on full frame of 75mm.

== Build quality ==
The lens features a weather resistant plastic exterior with a matte black finish. On the side of the lens are a pair of external switches controlling the lens' focusing range and autofocus-manual focus control. There is also a programmable focus-hold button for maintaining focus on a subject in motion.

The lens' autofocus motor is slow yet accurate on older Sony E-mount cameras and performs much better on newer cameras such as the Sony α6500 and Sony α9.

== Image quality ==
The lens is exceptionally sharp from its maximum aperture of f/2.8 across the frame. Distortion, vignetting, and chromatic aberration are all well controlled. The bokeh produced by this lens is smooth at its closest focusing distance.

== See also ==
- List of Sony E-mount lenses
- Zeiss Touit 2.8/50mm Macro
