= Zeiss Touit 2.8/50M =

- Maker: Zeiss
- Lens mount(s): Fujifilm X-mount, Sony E-mount

Technical data
- Type: Prime
- Focus drive: Micromotor
- Focal length: 50mm
- Focal length (35mm equiv.): 75mm
- Image format: APS-C
- Aperture (max/min): f/2.8
- Close focus distance: 0.15 metres (0.49 ft)
- Max. magnification: 1.0x
- Construction: 14 elements in 11 groups

Features
- Manual focus override: Yes Yes
- Weather-sealing: No No
- Lens-based stabilization: No No
- Macro capable: Yes Yes
- Aperture ring: Only in X-mount
- Unique features: dedicated macro lens
- Application: macro photography

Physical
- Max. length: 91 millimetres (3.6 in)
- Diameter: 65 millimetres (2.6 in)
- Weight: 290 grams (0.64 lb)
- Filter diameter: 52mm

History
- Introduction: 2014

The Zeiss Touit 2.8/50M is an APS-C macro prime lens for Sony E and Fujifilm X mounts announced by Zeiss on January 30, 2014.

== Build quality ==
The lens features a minimalist matte-black plastic exterior with a Zeiss badge on the side of the barrel and a rubber focus ring.

== See also ==
- List of third-party E-mount lenses
- Fujifilm X-mount Lenses
- Sony E 30mm F3.5 Macro
- Sony FE 50mm F2.8 Macro

== Sources ==
- http://www.dpreview.com/products/zeiss/lenses/zeiss_touit_50_2p8/specifications
