= Sony α6000 =

2014 APS-C mirrorless camera

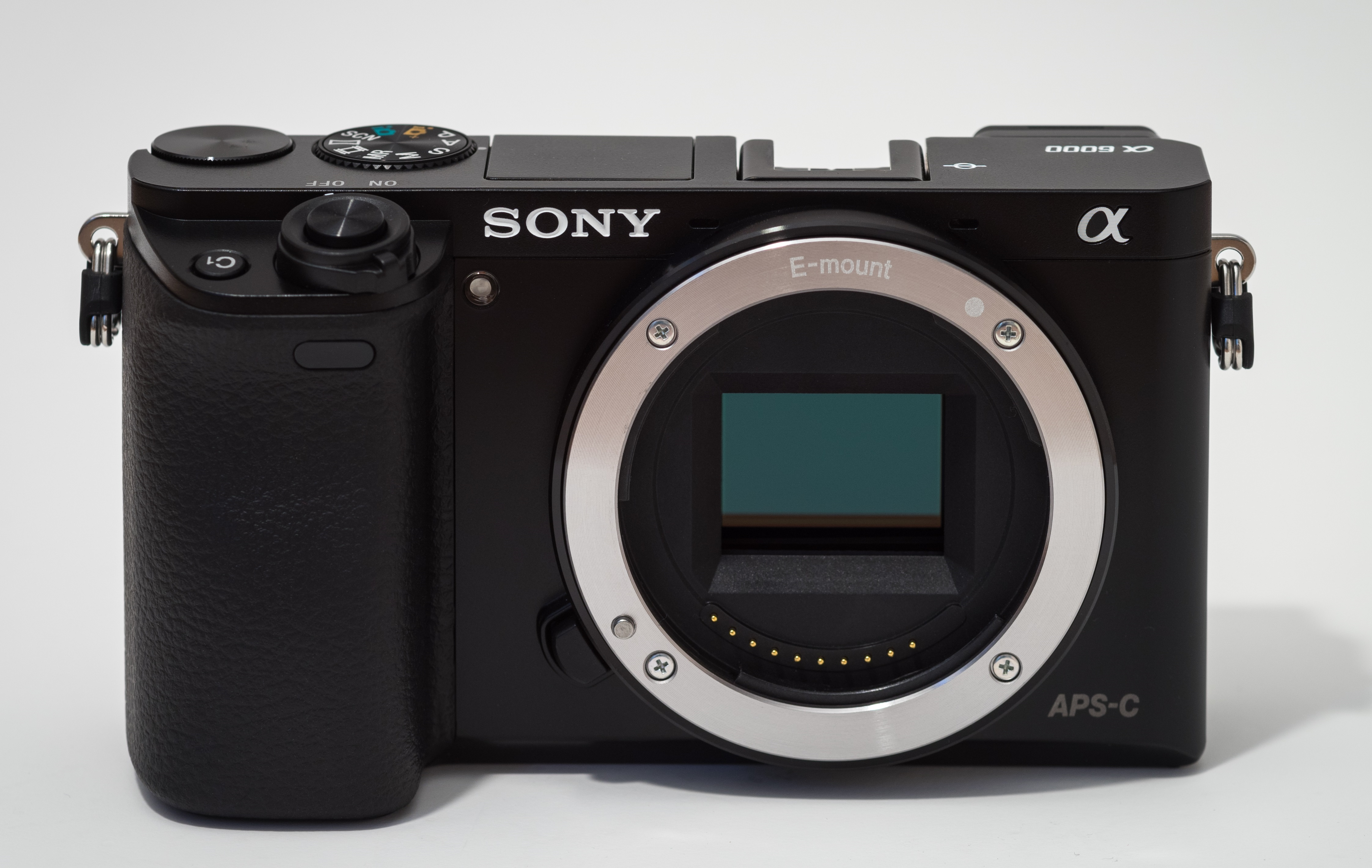

Overview
- Maker: Sony
- Type: Mirrorless interchangeable lens camera
- Released: February 2014

Lens
- Lens mount: Sony E-mount
- Lens: Interchangeable

Sensor/medium
- Sensor type: Exmor HD CMOS
- Sensor size: 23.5 × 15.6 mm (APS-C type)
- Maximum resolution: (3:2) 6000 × 4000 (24.3 MP) (16:9) 6000 × 3375 (20.1 MP)
- Film speed: Auto, 100 – 25600
- Recording medium: SD/ SDHC/SDXC, Memory Stick Pro Duo/ Pro-HG Duo

Focusing
- Focus areas: 179 focus points

Flash
- Flash: Incorporated flash (pop-out), hotshoe

Shutter
- Shutter speeds: 1/4000 s to 30 s
- Continuous shooting: 3 frame/s, 11 frame/s in speed priority mode

Viewfinder
- Viewfinder: Built-in 1.44 million dots OLED Electronic viewfinder
- Viewfinder magnification: 0.7
- Frame coverage: 100%

Image processing
- Image processor: Bionz X
- White balance: Yes

General
- LCD screen: 3 inches with 921,600 dots
- Battery: NP-FW50, InfoLITHIUM, 7.2 V, 1080 mAh, 7.7 Wh, Lithium-Ion rechargeable battery
- Dimensions: 120 × 67 × 45 mm (4.72 × 2.64 × 1.77 inches)
- Weight: 344 g (12 oz) including battery

Chronology
- Predecessor: Sony NEX-6, Sony NEX-7
- Successor: Sony α6300

The Sony α6000 (model ILCE-6000) is a digital camera announced 12 February 2014. It is a mirrorless interchangeable lens camera (MILC), which has a smaller body form factor than a traditional DSLR while retaining the sensor size and features of an APS-C-sized model. It is targeted at professionals, experienced users, and enthusiasts. It replaced the NEX-6 and NEX-7. Review websites note that although the α6000 uses a 24 MP sensor like the Sony NEX-7, the Sony α6000 can also be seen as more of a replacement of the Sony NEX-6. In the Firmware version 1.10, an android subsystem was added. The sub system was used to run Sony's apps.

At the time of its release, the Sony α6000 was advertised featuring the "world's fastest autofocus" with lag of 0.06 second and 11 fps continuous shooting with tracking AF. Its MSRP is $700 with a 16–50 mm power-zoom kit lens f/3.5-5.6.

Despite the announcement of an updated model in February 2016, the α6300, Sony has said they will continue production of the α6000.

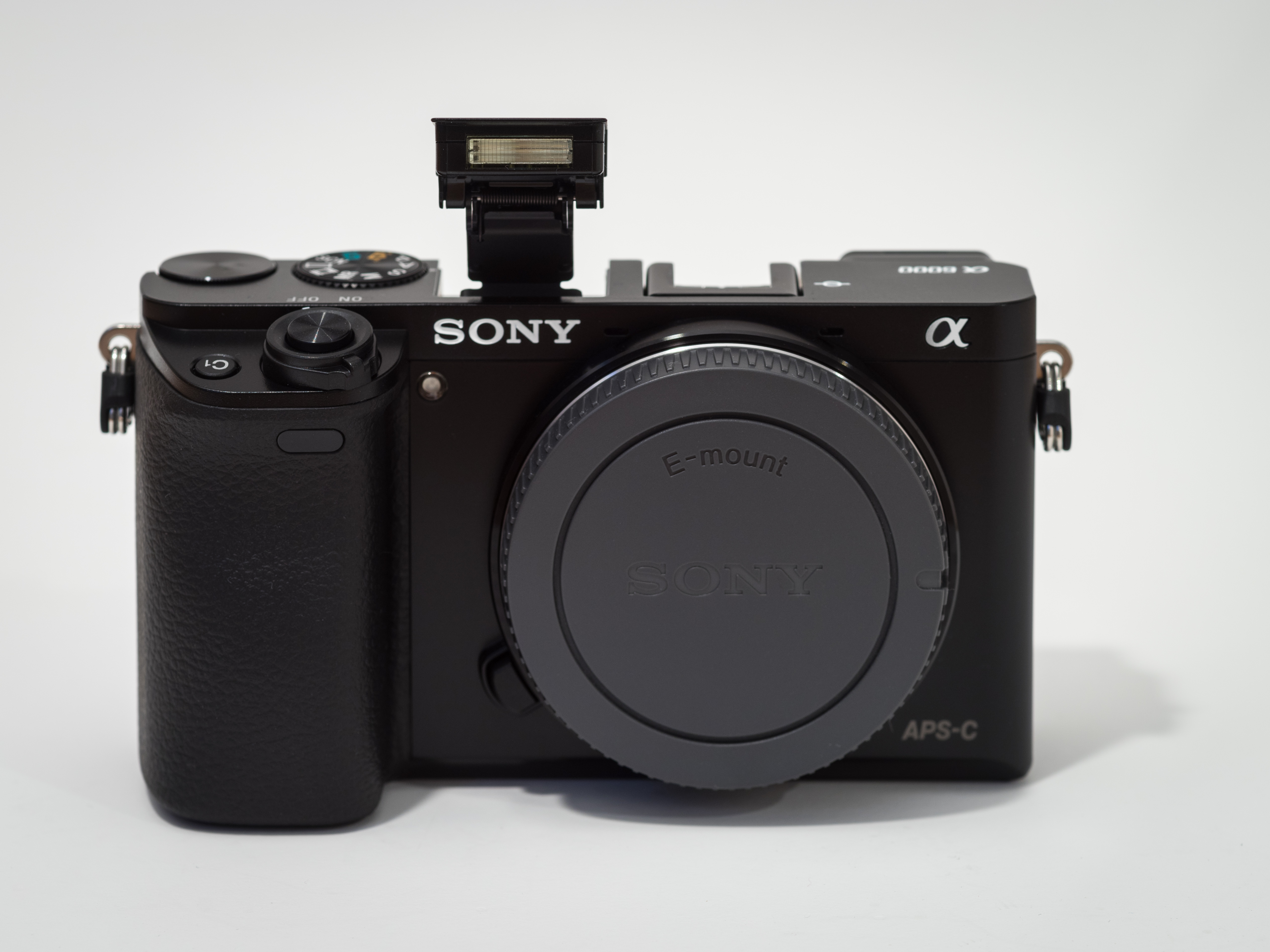

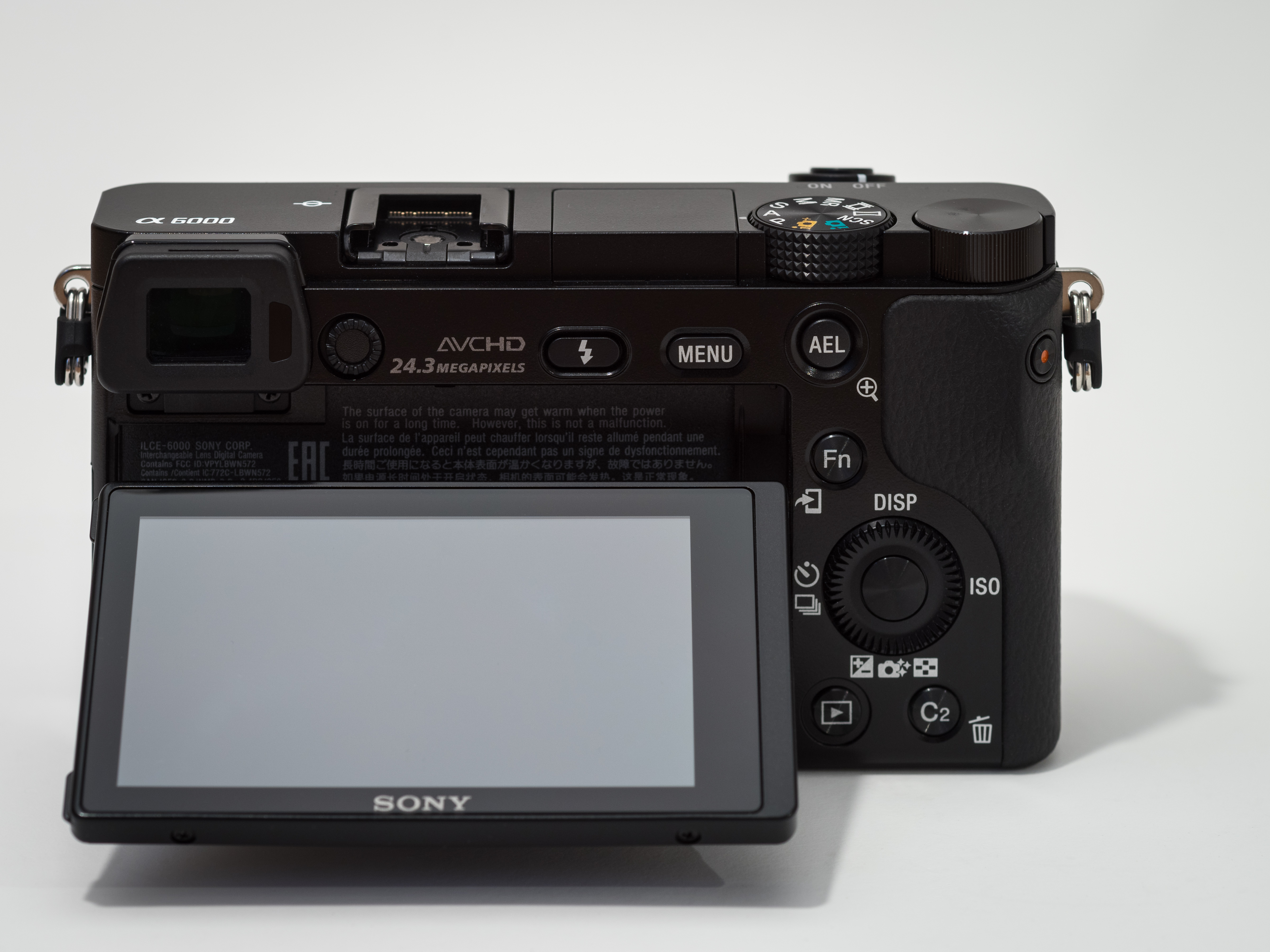

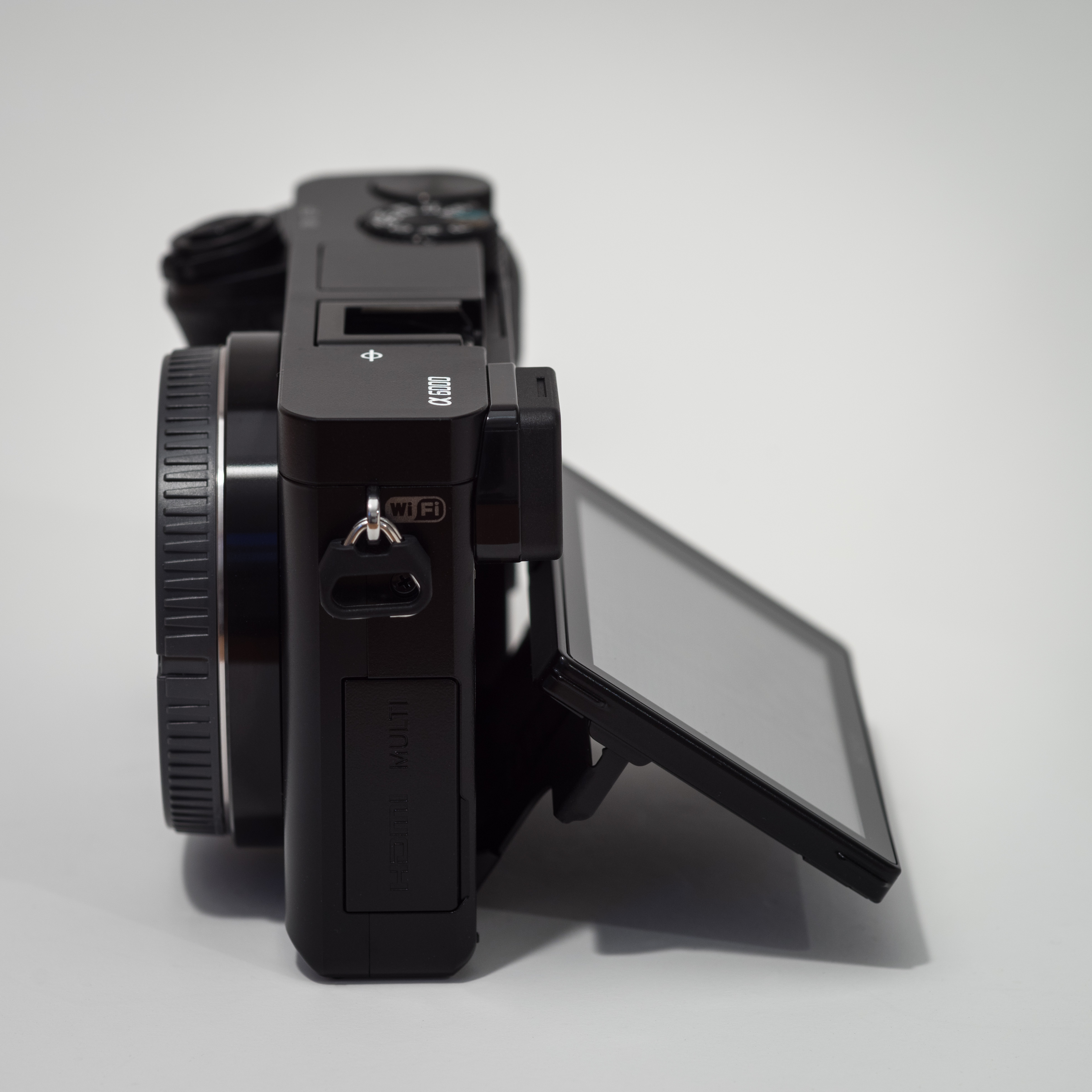

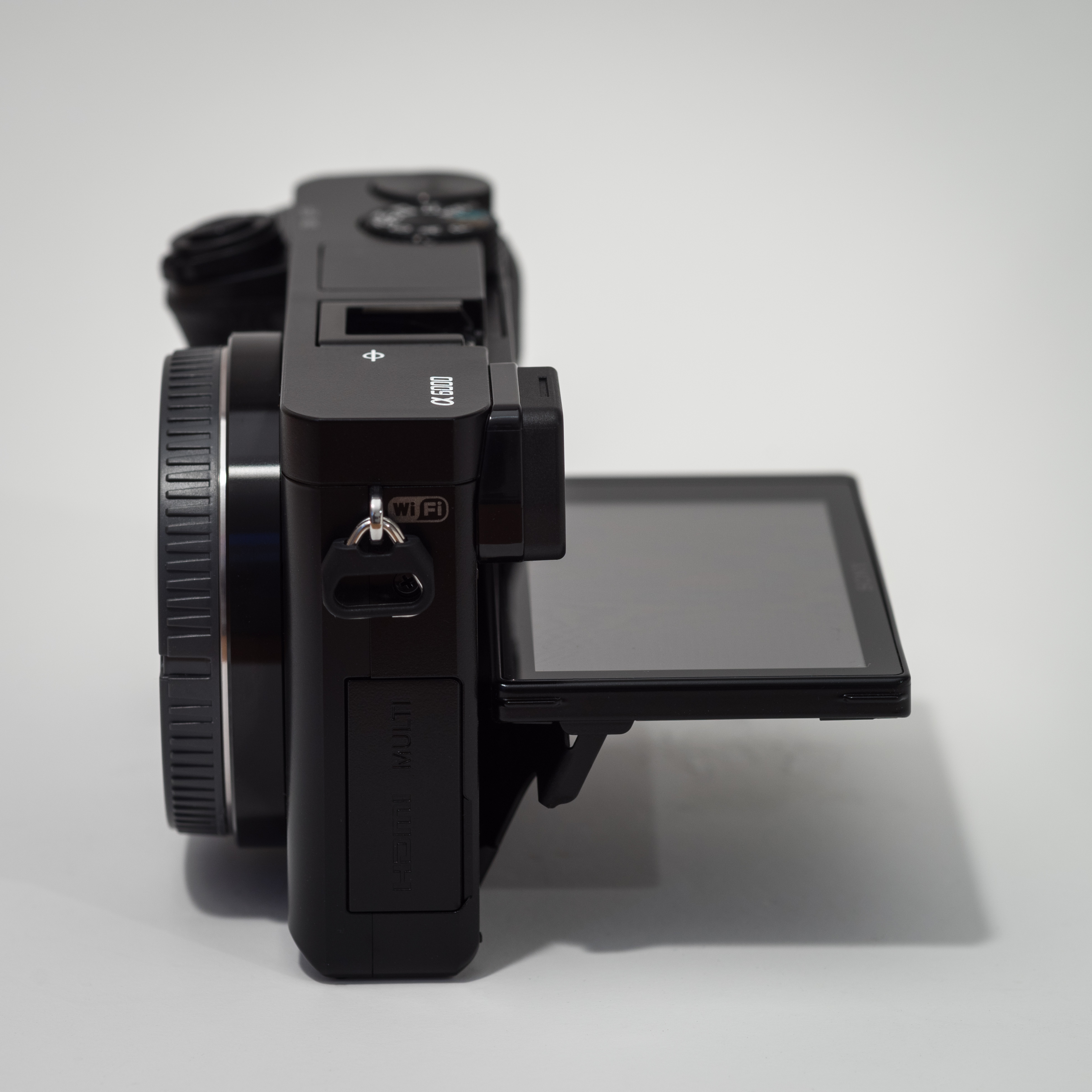

== Compared to its predecessor, Sony NEX-6 ==
The Sony α6000 was released one and a half year later, and has a slightly different shaped body than the NEX-6. The α6000's body silhouette is almost like a perfect rectangle. They use the same sensor size, but the α6000 has a 24 megapixel resolution, which is a 50% higher resolution, than the 16 MP NEX-6. The alpha model has an extra physical control dial, compared to the NEX model. The newer model has a slightly faster burst rate (11 fps vs 10 fps) and has almost twice as many autofocus points (179 vs 99), which makes it a lot more capable of sports photography. The α6000 also offers Near-field communication and smartphone remote control over Wi-Fi, which the NEX cannot do. The SD card slot supports UHS-I in the α6000 whereas the NEX-6 doesn't support any UHS standards. But there is one aspect which is a bit indistinctive and better in the older model: The NEX-6 has a 63% higher resolution electronic viewfinder than the α6000 (2,359,000 dots vs 1,440,000 dots).

== Compared to its other predecessor, Sony NEX-7 ==
The NEX-7 was introduced in 2011 and has a more rounded body than the α6000. They use the same 24 MP image sensor, but the noise performance is better in the newer model thanks to the better processor. It also offers a higher maximum sensitivity (25,600 vs 16,600). The largest improvement is the autofocus: The NEX-7 only has 25 focus points compared to the α6000's 179, giving it far more accuracy and speed. The burst rate of the NEX-7 is comparable to the NEX-6 (10 fps). There is no NFC, Wi-Fi remote control or UHS memory card support in the NEX-7, with the Alpha featuring each. The Alpha model is 56g lighter than the NEX. One feature the NEX-7 offers that the Alpha lacks is a microphone jack. In terms of their interfaces, they have different layouts but share some of the same parts for buttons and dials.

== Compared to its successor, Sony α6300 ==
The Sony α6300 is able to record 4k at 25 frames per second. which compares to the Sony α6000's maximum video capability of 1080p 60 frames per second. They share the BIONZ X processor. The Sony α6300 includes 3.5mm microphone jack which supports stereo audio. The viewfinder's differ in resolution with the Sony α6300's having 2.3 million dots compared to the Sony α6000's 1.4 million dots. Silent Shutter was also introduced with the Sony α6300. Neither camera has IBIS or officially recognized weather sealing.

== Popularity ==
The Sony α6000 proved to be an extremely popular camera. By early 2016, it was reported to be the best-selling interchangeable-lens camera in the over-US$600 price range as well as the best-selling mirrorless camera of all time.

== Firmware updates ==
Firmware version 1.10, released on 30 October 2014, added faster start up time and support for the "Smart Remote Control" Play Memories application.

Firmware version 1.20, released on 26 March 2015, improved images captured on new lenses and added a few minor enhancements.

Firmware version 1.21, released on 6 April 2015, fixed an error in version 1.20 and improved lens performance.

Firmware version 2.00, released on 16 June 2015, enabled video capture with the XAVC S codec to support high Bit Rates.

Firmware version 3.10, released on 17 March 2016, optimized lens performance (applied to the lenses releasing after 2016 March).

Firmware version 3.20, released on 26 July 2016, optimized lens performance (SEL-70200GM).

Firmware version 3.21, released on 19 March 2019, improved stability of the AF operation.

=== Mobile phone application update 2019 ===
There is an application (Image Edge Mobile) which allows a user to control the Sony A6000-A6500 camera. The application also allows a user to transfer photos over wireless to the user's mobile phone.

== Model differences ==
Model	NEX-7	NEX-6	α6000	α6300	α6500	α6400	α6100	α6600	α6700
Announced	24 Aug 2011	12 Sept 2012	12 Feb 2014	3 Feb 2016	6 Oct 2016	15 Jan 2019	28 Aug 2019		12 July 2023
Sensor resolution	24.3 MP Exmor CMOS; 6000 × 4000 pixels	16.1 MP Exmor CMOS; 4912 × 3264 pixels	24.3 MP Exmor CMOS; 6000 × 4000 pixels						26.2 MP Exmor R BSI-CMOS sensor 6192 × 4128 pixels
Processor	BIONZ		BIONZ X						BIONZ XR
ISO range	ISO 100-16000	ISO 100-25600				ISO 100-32000			
Autofocus	25 points CD-AF	25 points CD-AF w/ 99 points PD-AF	25 points CD-AF w/ 179 points PD-AF	25 points CD-AF w/ 425 points PD-AF					25 points CD-AF w/ 759 points PD-AF
Max Continuous Shooting	3 frame/s, 10 frame/s in speed priority mode		3 frame/s, 11 frame/s in speed priority mode	8 frame/s, 11 frame/s in speed priority mode				11 frame/s	
In-body image stabilization	No				Yes	No		Yes	
Shutter Speed	1/4000 – 30s								1/4000 – 30s 1/8000 with electronic shutter
Electronic shutter mode	No			Yes					
Monitor pixels	921.6 K								1037 K
Viewfinder dots	2.4 M		1.44 M	2.4 M			1.44 M	2.4 M	
Video record format	1080p 60fps				4K 30fps, 1080p 120fps		4k 30fps, 1080p 120fps		4K 120fps, 1080p 240fps
Battery Type	NP-FW50 (7.3Wh)							NP-FZ100 (16.4Wh)	
Weight w/ battery	353 g	345 g	344 g	404 g	453 g	403 g	396 g	503 g	493 g
Dimension	119.9 × 66.9 × 42.6 mm		120 × 67 × 45 mm	120 × 67 × 49 mm	120 × 67 × 53 mm	120 × 67 × 60 mm	120 × 67 × 59 mm	120 × 67 × 69 mm	120 × 69 × 64 mm

== See also ==
- List of Sony E-mount cameras
- Sony α6300
- Sony α6400
- Sony α6500
- Sony α6600
- Sony α6700
- Sony α7

Family	Level	Format	'10	2011		2012	2013	2014	2015	2016	2017	2018	2019	2020	2021	2022	2023	2024	2025	2026
Alpha (α)	Indust	FF																ILX-LR1 ^{●}		
Alpha (α)	Cine line	FF													_{m} FX6 ^{●}					
Alpha (α)	Cine line	FF																		_{m} FX5 ^{AT●}
Alpha (α)	Cine line	FF													_{m} FX3 ^{AT●}					
Alpha (α)	Cine line	FF																		_{m} FX2 ^{AT●}
Alpha (α)	Flag	FF													_{m} α1 ^{FT●}				_{m} α1 II ^{FAT●}	
Alpha (α)	Speed	FF										_{m} α9 ^{FT●}			_{m} α9 II ^{FT●}				_{m} α9 III ^{FAT●}	
Alpha (α)	Sens	FF							_{m} α7S ^{●}	_{m} α7S II ^{F●}					_{m} α7S III ^{AT●}					
Alpha (α)	Hi-Res	FF						_{m} α7R ^{●}		_{m} α7R II ^{F●}		_{m} α7R III ^{FT●}		_{m} α7R IV ^{FT●}			_{m} α7R V ^{FAT●}			_{m} α7R VI ^{FAT●}
Alpha (α)	Basic	FF						_{m} α7 ^{F●}	_{m} α7 II ^{F●}				_{m} α7 III ^{FT●}			_{m} α7 IV ^{AT●}				_{m} α7 V ^{FAT●}
Alpha (α)	Compact	FF																_{m} α7CR ^{AT●}		
Alpha (α)	Compact	FF													_{m} α7C ^{AT●}			_{m} α7C II ^{AT●}		
Alpha (α)	Vlog	FF																_{m} ZV-E1 ^{AT●}		
Alpha (α)	Cine	APS-C															_{m} FX30 ^{AT●}			
Alpha (α)	Adv	APS-C			_{s} NEX-7 ^{F●}						_{m} α6500 ^{FT●}			_{m} α6600 ^{FT●}				_{m} α6700 ^{AT●}		
Alpha (α)	Mid-range	APS-C				_{m} NEX-6 ^{F●}					_{m} α6300 ^{F●}		_{m} α6400 ^{F+T●}							
Alpha (α)	Mid-range	APS-C						_{m} α6000 ^{F●}						_{m} α6100 ^{FT●}						
Alpha (α)	Vlog	APS-C														_{m} ZV-E10 ^{AT●}			_{m} ZV-E10 II ^{AT●}	
Alpha (α)	Entry-level	APS-C	NEX-5 ^{F●}	NEX-5N ^{FT●}		NEX-5R ^{F+T●}	NEX-5T ^{F+T●}		α5100 ^{F+T●}											
Alpha (α)	Entry-level	APS-C	NEX-3 ^{F●}	NEX-C3 ^{F●}		NEX-F3 ^{F+●}	NEX-3N ^{F+●}	α5000 ^{F+●}												
DSLR-style		APS-C					_{m} α3000 ^{●}		_{m} α3500 ^{●}											
SmartShot		APS-C							QX1 ^{M●}											
CineAlta	Cine line	FF										VENICE				VENICE 2				
CineAlta	Cine line	FF																BURANO		
XDCAM	Cine line	FF												_{m} FX9						
XDCAM	Docu	S35							_{m} FS7		_{m} FS7 II									
XDCAM	Mobile	S35								_{m} FS5			_{m} FS5 II							
NXCAM	Pro	S35		NEX-FS100		NEX-FS700	NEX-FS700R													
NXCAM	APS-C					NEX-EA50														
Handycam	FF					_{m} NEX-VG900														
Handycam	APS-C		_{s} NEX-VG10		_{s} NEX-VG20	_{m} NEX-VG30														
Security		FF									SNC-VB770									
Security		FF									UMC-S3C									
Family	Level	Format																		
Family	Level	Format	'10	2011		2012	2013	2014	2015	2016	2017	2018	2019	2020	2021	2022	2023	2024	2025	2026
