= Sony α6700 =

2023 APS-C mirrorless camera

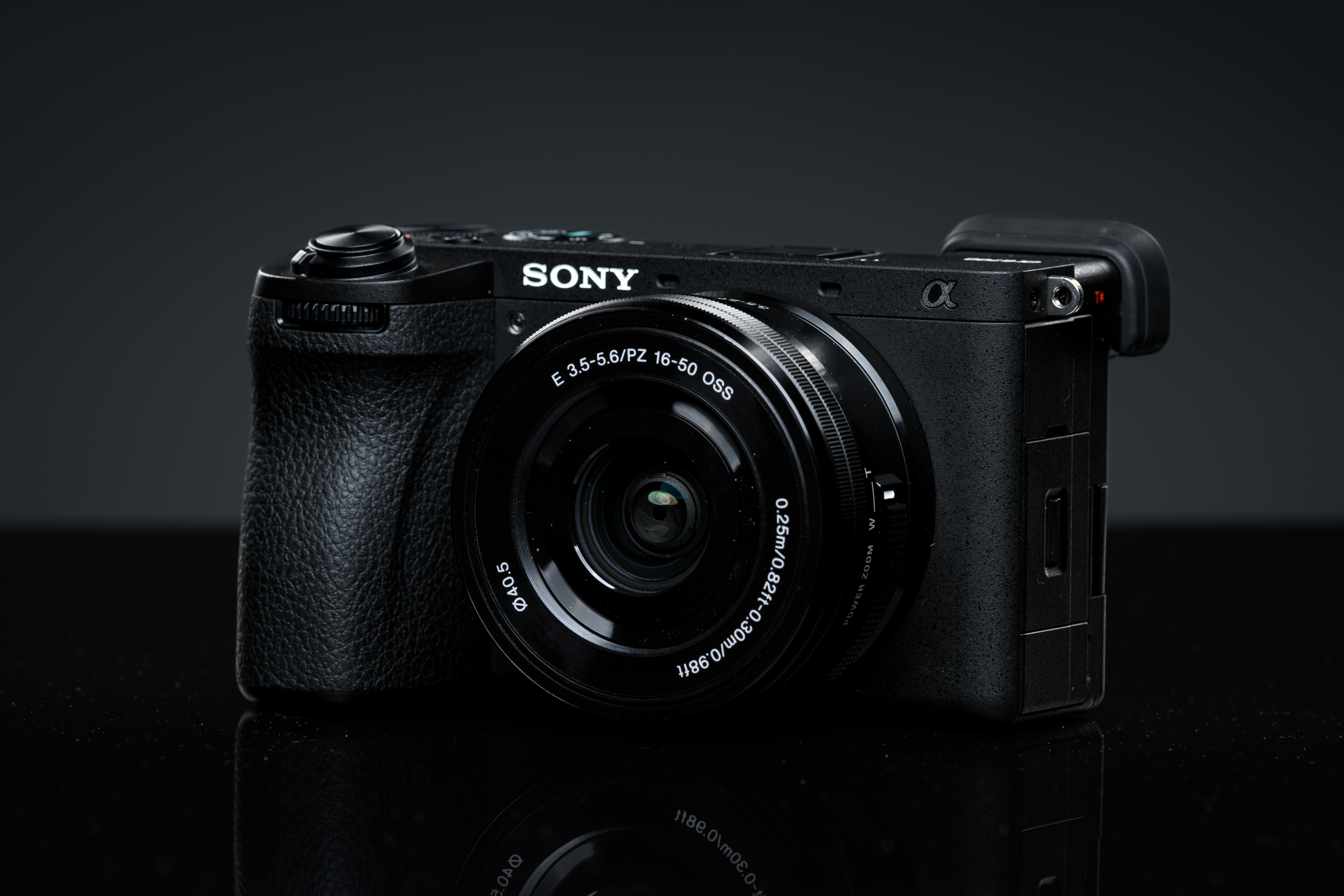
- A Sony α6700, pictured with an E PZ 16–50mm F3.5–5.6 OSS lens

Overview
- Maker: Sony
- Type: Mirrorless interchangeable lens camera
- Released: Late July 2023
- Intro price: USD$1,398.00 (body alone)

Lens
- Lens mount: Sony E-mount
- Lens: Interchangeable
- Compatible lenses: APS-C E-mount lenses

Sensor/medium
- Sensor type: Exmor R CMOS
- Sensor size: 23.3 x 15.5 mm (APS-C type)
- Sensor maker: Sony Semiconductor Solutions Corporation
- Maximum resolution: 6192 X 4128 (26MP)
- Film speed: Auto, 100 – 32 000 (50 – 102 400)
- Recording medium: SD (UHS-I/II compliant) memory card

Focusing
- Focus areas: 759 focus points

Flash
- Flash: No
- Flash synchronization: 1/160 sec
- Flash bracketing: Multi Interface Shoe

Shutter
- Frame rate: up to 11 fps
- Shutter: Mechanical, Electronic
- Shutter speeds: 1/4000 (1/8000 Electronic Shutter) to 30s, BULB
- Continuous shooting: 11 frame/s

Viewfinder
- Viewfinder: Yes, 1.0 cm (0.39 type) electronic 2.3M dot viewfinder
- Viewfinder magnification: 1.07
- Frame coverage: 100%

Image processing
- Image processor: BIONZ XR

General
- Video recording: 4K 120p/60p, HD 240p (S-Log3, LUT, S-Cine)
- LCD screen: 75 mm (3.0 in) with 1.03M dots
- Battery: NP-FZ100 Lithium-Ion rechargeable battery
- AV port: HDMI Type D (micro)
- Data port(s): USB-C, SuperSpeed 5Gbps USB 3.2 Type-C, 5GHz/2.4.GHz Wi-Fi, Bluetooth 4.2
- Dimensions: 12×7×8 cm (4.7×2.8×3.1 in)
- Weight: 493 g (17 oz)

Chronology
- Predecessor: Sony α6600

The Sony α6700 (model ILCE-6700) is a mirrorless APS-C format digital camera, released in July 2023 as a successor to the α6600. It features a 26MP Exmor sensor, upgraded 759 point phase detection autofocus (PDAF), and the ability to shoot 4K video at up to 120 frames per second. Powered by the BIONZ XR image processor, it offers an ISO range of 50 to 102 400 and can capture images at 11 frames per second with continuous autofocus and exposure tracking and 14-bit lossless compressed Raw.

== Features ==
The camera retains several advancements from its predecessor, the Sony α6600, and also incorporates some features from the higher‑end full‑frame Sony α7 IV. These include:

- 26 MP (approximately effective) APS-C Exmor-R CMOS sensor
- 759 phase detection AF points for still images, and 495 AF points for video
- real-time continuous eye‑AF tracking for humans, animals, and birds
- flip 3‑inch LCD vari-angle touchscreen with 1.03 million dots
- 2.3-million dot resolution EVF
- 5-axis optical in-body image stabilization with 5.5 stops of shake reduction
- 11 fps continuous shooting
- 4K 120p video recording with 6K oversampling
- battery life with NP‑FZ100 is rated at approximately 570 images using LCD screen and approximately 550 images using EVF
- native ISO range is 100 – 32,000 and extended ISO range is 50 – 102,400
- 10-bit HEIF image format
- weather-sealed magnesium alloy body
- multi Interface (MI) hot shoe

The single memory card slot on the left side of the Sony α6700, the card slot supports UHS-I/II compliant cards.

1 / SD card slot

== Video formats ==
The camera uses the in-house developed AVC Video Format called XAVC. The format is a compressed format achieving balanced quality and file size. Recording in colour depth of 10-bits and 4:2:2 chroma subsampling is possible with the XAVC codec. The camera features:

- all intra‑frame system that compresses each frame individually to achieve the best quality
- when recording 4K movies in the XAVC HS format, optional use of an HEVC codec (H.265) which has higher compression efficiency
  - the camera can record movies with higher image quality than XAVC S movies but with a similar data volume
- the camera can record in "Long GOP" codec (H.264) compression which compresses multiple frames to reduce file size

== Lens compatibility ==
Sony E-mount APS-C lenses are compatible with the α6700. The camera will also accept full‑frame E‑mount lens without issue.

== See also ==
- Sony α6000
- Sony α6500
- Sony α6600
- Sony α7 IV – a full frame mirrorless camera

Family	Level	Format	'10	2011		2012	2013	2014	2015	2016	2017	2018	2019	2020	2021	2022	2023	2024	2025	2026
Alpha (α)	Indust	FF																ILX-LR1 ^{●}		
Alpha (α)	Cine line	FF													_{m} FX6 ^{●}					
Alpha (α)	Cine line	FF													_{m} FX3 ^{AT●}					
Alpha (α)	Cine line	FF																		_{m} FX2 ^{AT●}
Alpha (α)	Flag	FF													_{m} α1 ^{FT●}				_{m} α1 II ^{FAT●}	
Alpha (α)	Speed	FF										_{m} α9 ^{FT●}			_{m} α9 II ^{FT●}				_{m} α9 III ^{FAT●}	
Alpha (α)	Sens	FF							_{m} α7S ^{●}	_{m} α7S II ^{F●}					_{m} α7S III ^{AT●}					
Alpha (α)	Hi-Res	FF						_{m} α7R ^{●}		_{m} α7R II ^{F●}		_{m} α7R III ^{FT●}		_{m} α7R IV ^{FT●}			_{m} α7R V ^{FAT●}			
Alpha (α)	Basic	FF						_{m} α7 ^{F●}	_{m} α7 II ^{F●}				_{m} α7 III ^{FT●}			_{m} α7 IV ^{AT●}				_{m} α7 V ^{FAT●}
Alpha (α)	Compact	FF																_{m} α7CR ^{AT●}		
Alpha (α)	Compact	FF													_{m} α7C ^{AT●}			_{m} α7C II ^{AT●}		
Alpha (α)	Vlog	FF																_{m} ZV-E1 ^{AT●}		
Alpha (α)	Cine	APS-C															_{m} FX30 ^{AT●}			
Alpha (α)	Adv	APS-C			_{s} NEX-7 ^{F●}						_{m} α6500 ^{FT●}			_{m} α6600 ^{FT●}				_{m} α6700 ^{AT●}		
Alpha (α)	Mid-range	APS-C				_{m} NEX-6 ^{F●}					_{m} α6300 ^{F●}		_{m} α6400 ^{F+T●}							
Alpha (α)	Mid-range	APS-C						_{m} α6000 ^{F●}						_{m} α6100 ^{FT●}						
Alpha (α)	Vlog	APS-C														_{m} ZV-E10 ^{AT●}			_{m} ZV-E10 II ^{AT●}	
Alpha (α)	Entry-level	APS-C	NEX-5 ^{F●}	NEX-5N ^{FT●}		NEX-5R ^{F+T●}	NEX-5T ^{F+T●}		α5100 ^{F+T●}											
Alpha (α)	Entry-level	APS-C	NEX-3 ^{F●}	NEX-C3 ^{F●}		NEX-F3 ^{F+●}	NEX-3N ^{F+●}	α5000 ^{F+●}												
DSLR-style		APS-C					_{m} α3000 ^{●}		_{m} α3500 ^{●}											
SmartShot		APS-C							QX1 ^{M●}											
CineAlta	Cine line	FF										VENICE				VENICE 2				
CineAlta	Cine line	FF																BURANO		
XDCAM	Cine line	FF												_{m} FX9						
XDCAM	Docu	S35							_{m} FS7		_{m} FS7 II									
XDCAM	Mobile	S35								_{m} FS5			_{m} FS5 II							
NXCAM	Pro	S35		NEX-FS100		NEX-FS700	NEX-FS700R													
NXCAM	APS-C					NEX-EA50														
Handycam	FF					_{m} NEX-VG900														
Handycam	APS-C		_{s} NEX-VG10		_{s} NEX-VG20	_{m} NEX-VG30														
Security		FF									SNC-VB770									
Security		FF									UMC-S3C									
Family	Level	Format																		
Family	Level	Format	'10	2011		2012	2013	2014	2015	2016	2017	2018	2019	2020	2021	2022	2023	2024	2025	2026
