= Sony E 30mm F3.5 Macro =

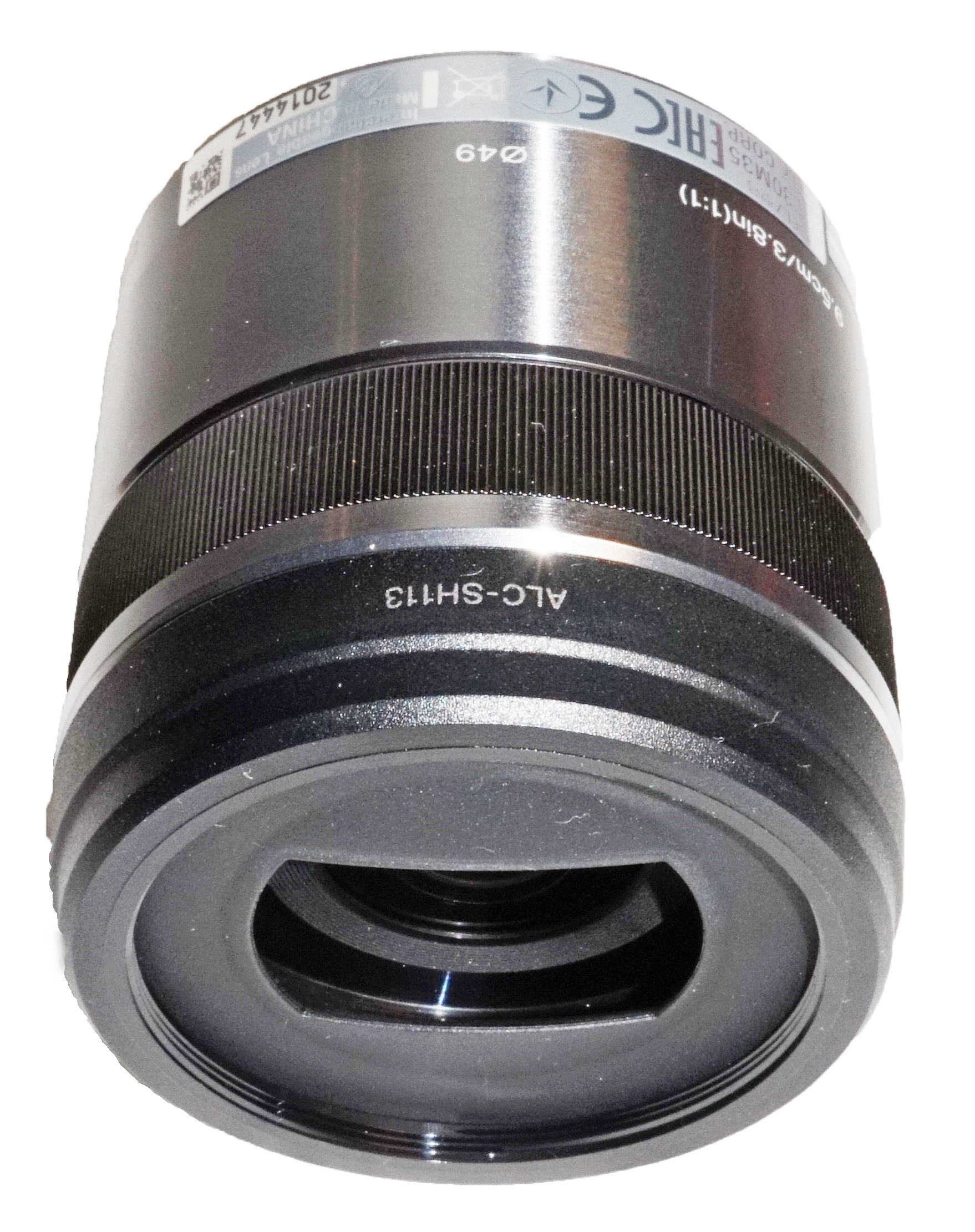
- Maker: Sony
- Lens mount(s): Sony E-mount

Technical data
- Type: Prime
- Focus drive: Stepper motor
- Focal length: 30mm
- Focal length (35mm equiv.): 45mm
- Image format: APS-C
- Aperture (max/min): f/3.5 - 22.0
- Close focus distance: 0.095 metres (0.31 ft)
- Max. magnification: 1.0x
- Diaphragm blades: 7
- Construction: 7 elements in 6 groups

Features
- Manual focus override: Yes Yes
- Weather-sealing: No No
- Lens-based stabilization: No No
- Macro capable: Yes Yes
- Aperture ring: No No
- Unique features: Dedicated macro lens
- Application: Macro photography

Physical
- Max. length: 55.5 millimetres (2.19 in)
- Diameter: 62.0 millimetres (2.44 in)
- Weight: 138 grams (0.304 lb)
- Filter diameter: 49mm

Accessories
- Lens hood: Cap-type (ALC-SH113)

History
- Introduction: 2011

Retail info
- MSRP: $278 USD

The Sony E 30mm F3.5 Macro is an APS-C macro prime lens for the Sony E-mount, announced by Sony on June 8, 2011.

== Build quality ==
The lens features a plastic exterior with a silver finish and a pancake-style lens hood. As of June 2017, the 30mm Macro lens is one of only 3 E-mount lens manufactured by Sony that are specifically designed for macro photography, with the others being the Sony FE 50mm F2.8 Macro and Sony FE 90mm F2.8 Macro G OSS lenses.

== Image quality ==
Sharpness is fair, appearing softer around the outer edges of the frame when at F3.5 (which sharpens up when stopped down to f/8.0). The lens also suffers from moderate vignetting and chromatic aberration.

== See also ==
- List of Sony E-mount lenses
- Sony FE 50mm F2.8 Macro
- Zeiss Touit 2.8/50mm Macro
