= Sony NEX-7 =

2011 compact mirrorless camera

Sony α NEX-7
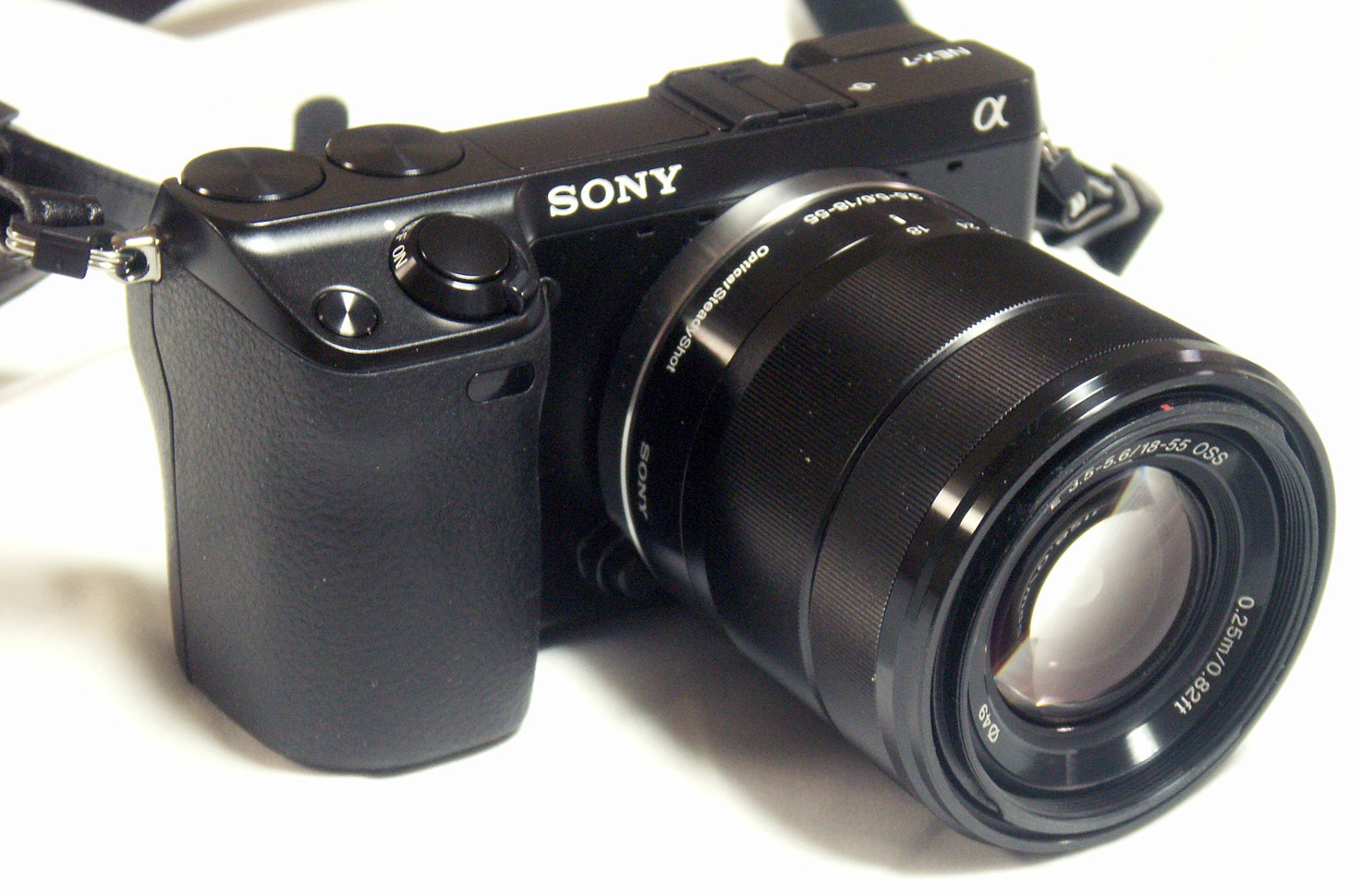
- Sony NEX-7 with Sony SEL-1855

Overview
- Maker: Sony Group
- Type: Mirrorless interchangeable lens camera

Lens
- Lens: Sony E-mount

Sensor/medium
- Sensor: 23.4 × 15.6 mm Exmor APS-C HD CMOS Sensor
- Maximum resolution: 6000 × 4000 (3:2) (24.3 megapixels)
- Film speed: 100 – 16000
- Storage media: Memory Stick Pro Duo, Pro-HG Duo, SD, SDHC, SDXC

Focusing
- Focus modes: Contrast-detection auto-focus, 25 multi-point, Centre-weighted, Flexible Spot

Exposure/metering
- Exposure modes: Intelligent Auto, Program, Aperture priority, Shutter priority, Manual, Scene modes, 3D Sweep Panorama, Sweep Panorama, Anti Motion Blur
- Exposure metering: Multi-segment, Center-weighted, Spot
- Metering modes: Multi-segment, Centre-weighted, Spot

Flash
- Flash: Incorporated flash (pop-out)

Shutter
- Shutter: Electronically-controlled, vertical-traverse, focal-plane shutter
- Shutter speed range: 1/4000 - 30 sec, BULB
- Continuous shooting: 3 frame/s, 10 frame/s in speed priority mode

Viewfinder
- Viewfinder: Built-in 2.4 million dots OLED Electronic viewfinder

Image processing
- White balance: Auto, Daylight, Shade, Cloudy, Tungsten, Fluorescent (Warm, Cool, Day, Daylight), Flash, Color temperature/filter (2500 - 9900 K), Manual (Custom), Manual (Custom set)

General
- LCD screen: 3.0 in (76 mm) XtraFine TruBlack LCD, 921,600 pixels
- Battery: NP-FW50, InfoLITHIUM, 7.2 V, 1080 mAh, 7.7 Wh, Lithium-Ion rechargeable battery
- Dimensions: 119.9 × 66.9 × 42.6 mm
- Weight: Approx. 353 g (12.5 oz) (camera body, card and battery)
- Made in: Thailand

The α NEX-7 is a interchangeable lens mirrorless camera designed and manufactured by Sony, first released in August 2011. It features a smaller body than a traditional digital single-lens reflex camera, and utilizes an APS-C-sized image sensor. It is targeted at experienced users, enthusiasts and professionals. It is replaced by the ILCE-6000 (α6000).

== Features ==
The NEX-7 utilizes a 24.3 megapixel, CMOS active-pixel sensor of the APS-C image sensor format. It supports 1920×1080 video recording at up to 60 frames per second (fps), encoded in AVCHD 2 format; it additionally supports continuous shooting of stills at 10 fps. The NEX-7 is built with magnesium alloy, and incorporates an XGA OLED electronic viewfinder with 2.4 million dots resolution. The camera's specifications are as follows:

- 24 megapixel APS-C CMOS image sensor
- ISO 100-16000
- 2.4 million dot OLED Electronic viewfinder
- Electronic first-curtain shutter (for faster response time)
- 1080p 60 HD video recording with built-in mic (stereo)
- Rear screen with tilt feature (without touch controls)
- Built-in flash and alpha hot shoe
- remote control receiver (infra-red)
- 3.5 mm audio jack for external mic input

== Reception ==
Albeit being delayed for a few months because of 2011's Thai floods, the α NEX-7 was very well received by critics and users. In regions like Hong Kong, α NEX-7 was always running out of stock. DPreview.com and PhotographyBlog gave it their highest awards, with the highest score ever attained by an APS class camera. α NEX-7 also won the best camera in Camera Grand Prix 2012 under professional catalog, which was voted by a professional community consisting of 57 council members from the professional press field of the Camera Journal Press Club.

== Image quality ==
At the time of its release, the Sony Alpha NEX-7 had the best image quality among any mirrorless interchangeable-lens compact camera which had been tested by DxO Labs and also the best APS-C Sensor camera from Sony. Sony α65, Sony α77 and NEX-7 have similar sensors and received DxOMark Overall Scores of 74, 78, and 81, respectively. The image quality of NEX-7 can be comparable with Nikon D7000 (score 80) and Pentax K-5 (score 82).

== Hasselblad Lunar ==
In September 2012, the Swedish camera manufacturer Hasselblad announced a collaboration with Sony and a mirrorless compact camera at photokina 2012 in Cologne, Germany. This camera, named Lunar, is based on the Sony NEX-7 with identical key specifications, but with aesthetic differences in exterior design and menu system. In January 2014, Hasselblad announced another cosmetic variant of the camera, limited to 200 units, named the Lunar Limited Edition.

== See also ==
- List of Sony E-mount cameras
- Sony NEX-5
- Sony α6000

Family	Level	Format	'10	2011		2012	2013	2014	2015	2016	2017	2018	2019	2020	2021	2022	2023	2024	2025	2026
Alpha (α)	Indust	FF																ILX-LR1 ^{●}		
Alpha (α)	Cine line	FF													_{m} FX6 ^{●}					
Alpha (α)	Cine line	FF																		_{m} FX5 ^{AT●}
Alpha (α)	Cine line	FF													_{m} FX3 ^{AT●}					
Alpha (α)	Cine line	FF																		_{m} FX2 ^{AT●}
Alpha (α)	Flag	FF													_{m} α1 ^{FT●}				_{m} α1 II ^{FAT●}	
Alpha (α)	Speed	FF										_{m} α9 ^{FT●}			_{m} α9 II ^{FT●}				_{m} α9 III ^{FAT●}	
Alpha (α)	Sens	FF							_{m} α7S ^{●}	_{m} α7S II ^{F●}					_{m} α7S III ^{AT●}					
Alpha (α)	Hi-Res	FF						_{m} α7R ^{●}		_{m} α7R II ^{F●}		_{m} α7R III ^{FT●}		_{m} α7R IV ^{FT●}			_{m} α7R V ^{FAT●}			_{m} α7R VI ^{FAT●}
Alpha (α)	Basic	FF						_{m} α7 ^{F●}	_{m} α7 II ^{F●}				_{m} α7 III ^{FT●}			_{m} α7 IV ^{AT●}				_{m} α7 V ^{FAT●}
Alpha (α)	Compact	FF																_{m} α7CR ^{AT●}		
Alpha (α)	Compact	FF													_{m} α7C ^{AT●}			_{m} α7C II ^{AT●}		
Alpha (α)	Vlog	FF																_{m} ZV-E1 ^{AT●}		
Alpha (α)	Cine	APS-C															_{m} FX30 ^{AT●}			
Alpha (α)	Adv	APS-C			_{s} NEX-7 ^{F●}						_{m} α6500 ^{FT●}			_{m} α6600 ^{FT●}				_{m} α6700 ^{AT●}		
Alpha (α)	Mid-range	APS-C				_{m} NEX-6 ^{F●}					_{m} α6300 ^{F●}		_{m} α6400 ^{F+T●}							
Alpha (α)	Mid-range	APS-C						_{m} α6000 ^{F●}						_{m} α6100 ^{FT●}						
Alpha (α)	Vlog	APS-C														_{m} ZV-E10 ^{AT●}			_{m} ZV-E10 II ^{AT●}	
Alpha (α)	Entry-level	APS-C	NEX-5 ^{F●}	NEX-5N ^{FT●}		NEX-5R ^{F+T●}	NEX-5T ^{F+T●}		α5100 ^{F+T●}											
Alpha (α)	Entry-level	APS-C	NEX-3 ^{F●}	NEX-C3 ^{F●}		NEX-F3 ^{F+●}	NEX-3N ^{F+●}	α5000 ^{F+●}												
DSLR-style		APS-C					_{m} α3000 ^{●}		_{m} α3500 ^{●}											
SmartShot		APS-C							QX1 ^{M●}											
CineAlta	Cine line	FF										VENICE				VENICE 2				
CineAlta	Cine line	FF																BURANO		
XDCAM	Cine line	FF												_{m} FX9						
XDCAM	Docu	S35							_{m} FS7		_{m} FS7 II									
XDCAM	Mobile	S35								_{m} FS5			_{m} FS5 II							
NXCAM	Pro	S35		NEX-FS100		NEX-FS700	NEX-FS700R													
NXCAM	APS-C					NEX-EA50														
Handycam	FF					_{m} NEX-VG900														
Handycam	APS-C		_{s} NEX-VG10		_{s} NEX-VG20	_{m} NEX-VG30														
Security		FF									SNC-VB770									
Security		FF									UMC-S3C									
Family	Level	Format																		
Family	Level	Format	'10	2011		2012	2013	2014	2015	2016	2017	2018	2019	2020	2021	2022	2023	2024	2025	2026
