= Sony α6300 =

2016 APS-C mirrorless camera

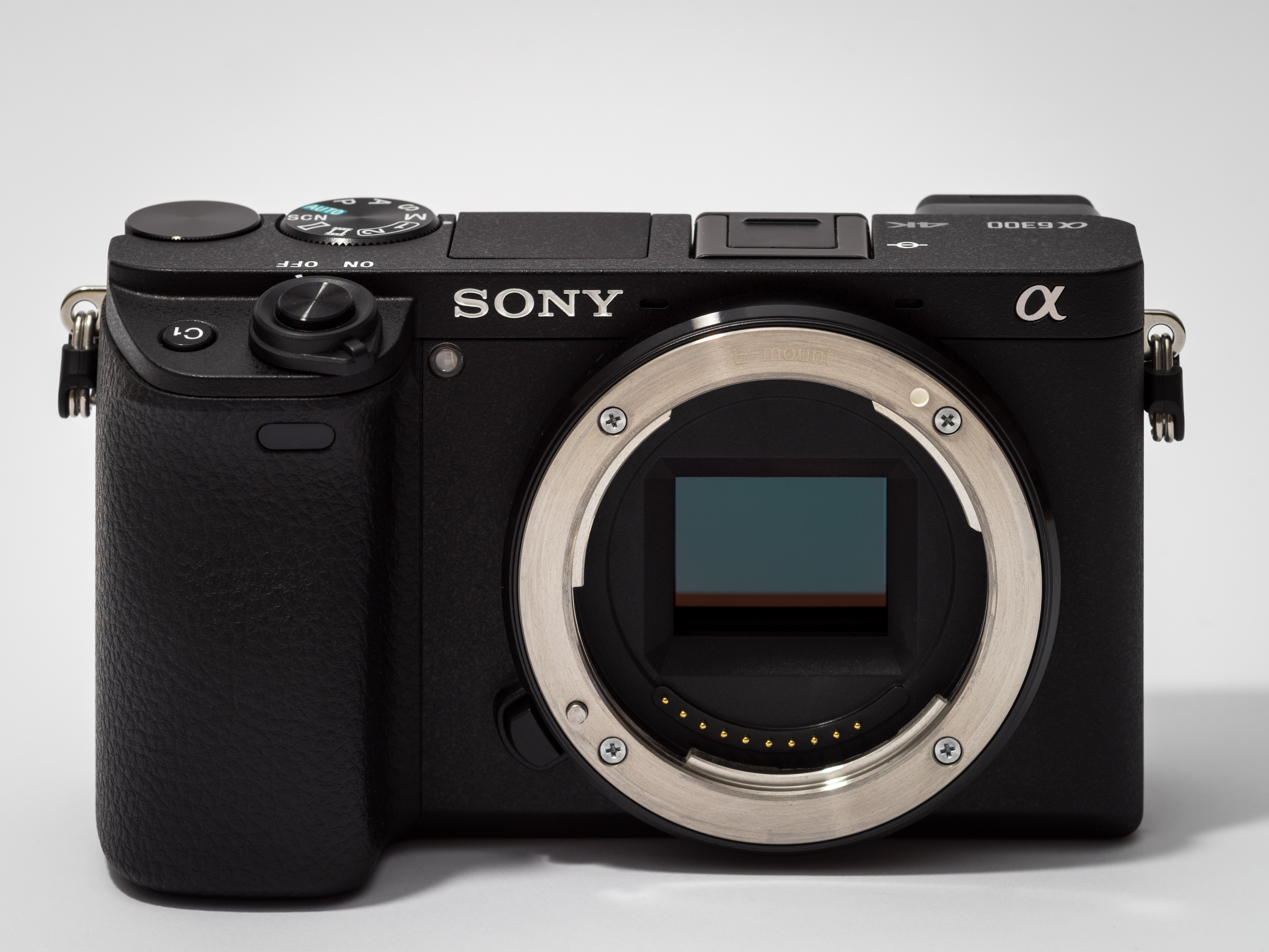

Overview
- Maker: Sony
- Type: Mirrorless interchangeable lens camera

Lens
- Lens mount: Sony E-mount

Sensor/medium
- Sensor type: Exmor HD CMOS
- Sensor size: 23.5 × 15.6 mm (APS-C type)
- Sensor maker: Sony
- Maximum resolution: (3:2) 6000 × 4000 (24.3 MP) (16:9) 6000 × 3375 (20.1 MP)
- Film speed: Auto, 100 – 25600 (51200)
- Recording medium: SD/ SDHC/SDXC, Memory Stick Pro Duo/ Pro-HG Duo

Focusing
- Focus areas: 425 focus points

Flash
- Flash: incorporated flash (pop-out), hotshoe

Shutter
- Frame rate: up to 120fps
- Shutter speeds: 1/4000 s to 30 s
- Continuous shooting: 8 frame/s, 11 frame/s in speed priority mode

Viewfinder
- Viewfinder: Built-in 2.36 million dots OLED electronic viewfinder
- Viewfinder magnification: 0.7
- Frame coverage: 100%

Image processing
- Image processor: BIONZ X with front-end LSI
- White balance: Yes

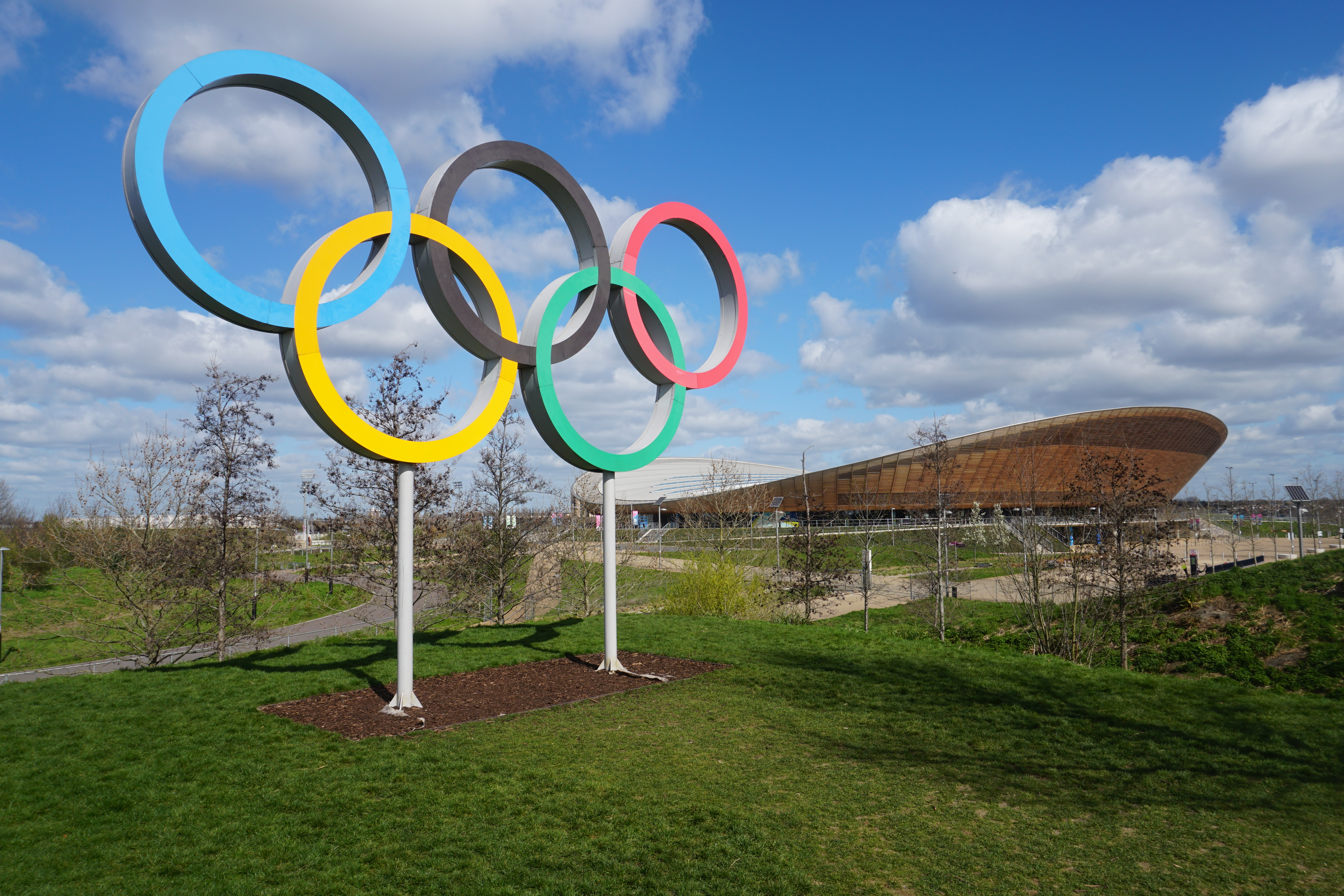
Photo shot on a Sony α6300

The Sony α6300 (model ILCE-6300) is a mirrorless digital camera announced on 3 February 2016. The α6300 features a 24 megapixel Exmor sensor with a new 4D AF system with 425 phase detection autofocus points. The camera is powered by Sony's Bionz X image processor with an ISO range up to 51,200. Additionally, the α6300 can shoot images at up to 11 frames per second with continuous autofocus and exposure tracking. This model also introduced 4K recording for the first time in a non-full-frame Sony camera, with it sampling to 6K before being downsampled to 4K.

On 6 October 2016, the a6500 was released, meant to serve as a replacement.

== Features ==
- 24-megapixel CMOS Sensor with Copper Wiring
- 425 focus points with phase-detection AF system
- 11.1 fps continuous shutter, with 8 fps in live view
- 100-25600 ISO, expandable to 51200
- 2.4 million dot OLED Tru-Finder with a 120hz refresh rate
- 4K Video Capability at 100 Mbps
- Supports XAVC S, AVCHD at 28 Mbps, MPEG-4, and H.264 codecs.
- Battery capable of 400 shots on the Viewfinder, compared to its predecessor's battery life of 360.
- Wi-Fi and NFC support, with support to control the camera and transfer photos via the Image Edge Mobile app
- Magnesium Alloy Design with upgraded water and dust resistance
- 3.5mm Microphone Port
- Sony E-mount support, supporting both full-frame (FE) and APS-C (E) lenses
- 3-Inch 921k-dot non-touch screen

== Reception ==
Techradar rated it with a 4/5-star rating, praising its JPEG quality, view finder, and its AF focus speed. But disliked the camera's lack of raw processing and its display power, along with a lack of touch screen.

DPReview found the progress in technology impressive, and were happy to see a Magnesium Alloy Body and its included dust and moisture resistance. However, they also said the lack of a touchscreen, or direct AF point selection with a dedicated joystick or control to be problematic for some.

== See also ==
- Sony α6000
- Sony α6500
- Sony α6400
- Sony α7R II

Family	Level	Format	'10	2011		2012	2013	2014	2015	2016	2017	2018	2019	2020	2021	2022	2023	2024	2025	2026
Alpha (α)	Indust	FF																ILX-LR1 ^{●}		
Alpha (α)	Cine line	FF													_{m} FX6 ^{●}					
Alpha (α)	Cine line	FF																		_{m} FX5 ^{AT●}
Alpha (α)	Cine line	FF													_{m} FX3 ^{AT●}					
Alpha (α)	Cine line	FF																		_{m} FX2 ^{AT●}
Alpha (α)	Flag	FF													_{m} α1 ^{FT●}				_{m} α1 II ^{FAT●}	
Alpha (α)	Speed	FF										_{m} α9 ^{FT●}			_{m} α9 II ^{FT●}				_{m} α9 III ^{FAT●}	
Alpha (α)	Sens	FF							_{m} α7S ^{●}	_{m} α7S II ^{F●}					_{m} α7S III ^{AT●}					
Alpha (α)	Hi-Res	FF						_{m} α7R ^{●}		_{m} α7R II ^{F●}		_{m} α7R III ^{FT●}		_{m} α7R IV ^{FT●}			_{m} α7R V ^{FAT●}			_{m} α7R VI ^{FAT●}
Alpha (α)	Basic	FF						_{m} α7 ^{F●}	_{m} α7 II ^{F●}				_{m} α7 III ^{FT●}			_{m} α7 IV ^{AT●}				_{m} α7 V ^{FAT●}
Alpha (α)	Compact	FF																_{m} α7CR ^{AT●}		
Alpha (α)	Compact	FF													_{m} α7C ^{AT●}			_{m} α7C II ^{AT●}		
Alpha (α)	Vlog	FF																_{m} ZV-E1 ^{AT●}		
Alpha (α)	Cine	APS-C															_{m} FX30 ^{AT●}			
Alpha (α)	Adv	APS-C			_{s} NEX-7 ^{F●}						_{m} α6500 ^{FT●}			_{m} α6600 ^{FT●}				_{m} α6700 ^{AT●}		
Alpha (α)	Mid-range	APS-C				_{m} NEX-6 ^{F●}					_{m} α6300 ^{F●}		_{m} α6400 ^{F+T●}							
Alpha (α)	Mid-range	APS-C						_{m} α6000 ^{F●}						_{m} α6100 ^{FT●}						
Alpha (α)	Vlog	APS-C														_{m} ZV-E10 ^{AT●}			_{m} ZV-E10 II ^{AT●}	
Alpha (α)	Entry-level	APS-C	NEX-5 ^{F●}	NEX-5N ^{FT●}		NEX-5R ^{F+T●}	NEX-5T ^{F+T●}		α5100 ^{F+T●}											
Alpha (α)	Entry-level	APS-C	NEX-3 ^{F●}	NEX-C3 ^{F●}		NEX-F3 ^{F+●}	NEX-3N ^{F+●}	α5000 ^{F+●}												
DSLR-style		APS-C					_{m} α3000 ^{●}		_{m} α3500 ^{●}											
SmartShot		APS-C							QX1 ^{M●}											
CineAlta	Cine line	FF										VENICE				VENICE 2				
CineAlta	Cine line	FF																BURANO		
XDCAM	Cine line	FF												_{m} FX9						
XDCAM	Docu	S35							_{m} FS7		_{m} FS7 II									
XDCAM	Mobile	S35								_{m} FS5			_{m} FS5 II							
NXCAM	Pro	S35		NEX-FS100		NEX-FS700	NEX-FS700R													
NXCAM	APS-C					NEX-EA50														
Handycam	FF					_{m} NEX-VG900														
Handycam	APS-C		_{s} NEX-VG10		_{s} NEX-VG20	_{m} NEX-VG30														
Security		FF									SNC-VB770									
Security		FF									UMC-S3C									
Family	Level	Format																		
Family	Level	Format	'10	2011		2012	2013	2014	2015	2016	2017	2018	2019	2020	2021	2022	2023	2024	2025	2026
