= Sony FE 90mm F2.8 Macro G OSS =

Interchangeable lens for Sony mirrorless cameras

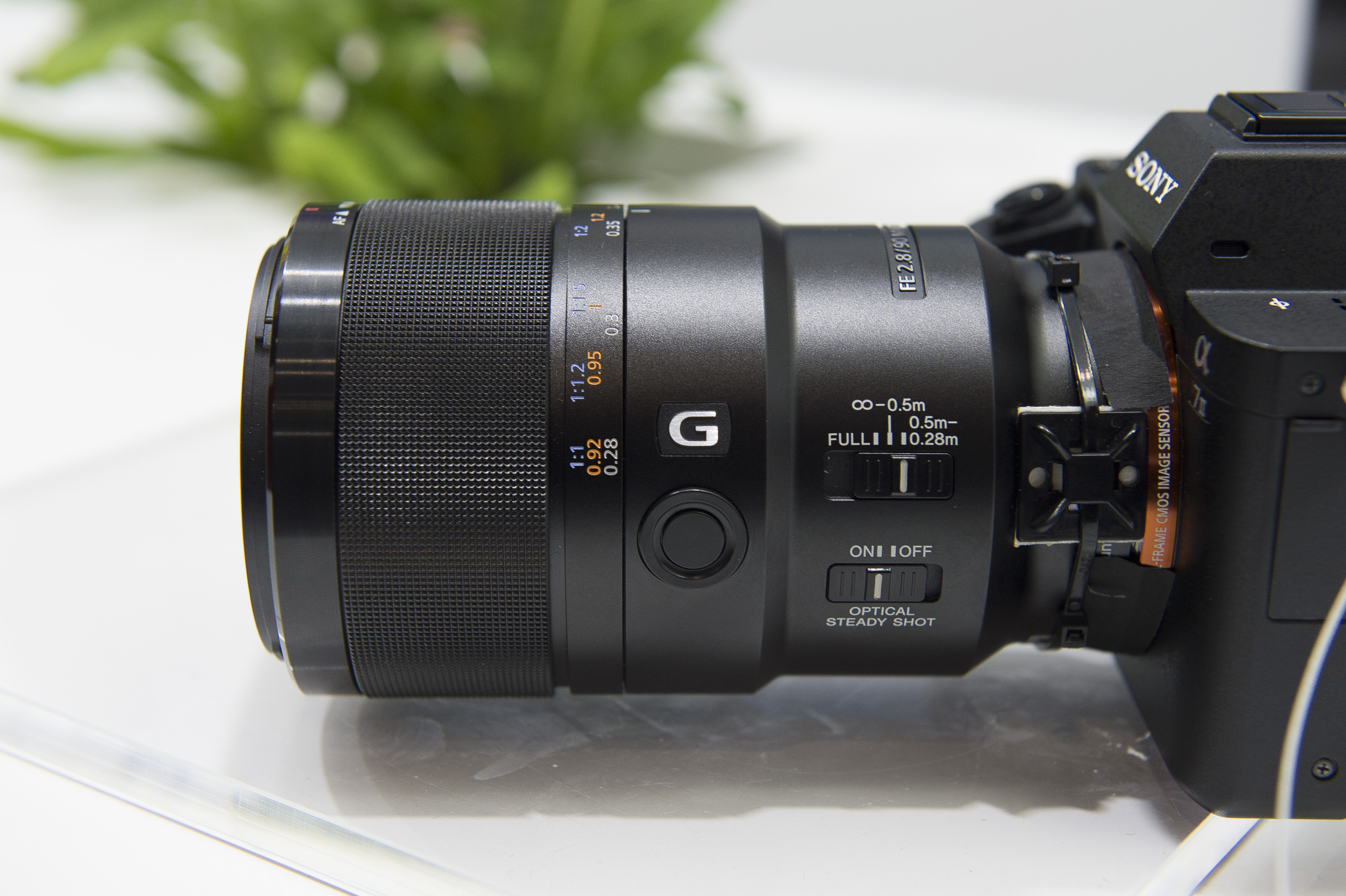
- Sony 90mm Macro attached to a Sony α7II
- Maker: Sony
- Lens mount: Sony E-mount
- Part number: SEL-90M28G (VX9118)

Technical data
- Type: Prime
- Focus drive: dual-motor linear drive piezo-electric (DDSSM)
- Focal length: 90mm
- Image format: 35mm full-frame
- Aperture (max/min): f/2.8 (22)
- Close focus distance: 0.28 metres (0.92 ft)
- Max. magnification: 1:1 (1×)
- Diaphragm blades: 9 blades, circular
- Construction: 15 elements in 11 groups

Features
- Manual focus override: Yes Yes
- Weather-sealing: Yes Yes
- Lens-based stabilization: Yes Yes
- Macro capable: Yes Yes
- Aperture ring: No No
- Unique features: G series, internal focusing with double floating elements, dedicated macro lens
- Application: portrait, macro

Physical
- Min. length: 130.5 millimetres (5.14 in)
- Max. length: 130.5 millimetres (5.14 in)
- Diameter: 79 millimetres (3.1 in)
- Weight: 602 grams (1.327 lb)
- Filter diameter: 62mm
- Color: black

Software
- Lens ID: 32802
- Lens spec: "FE 90mm F2.8 Macro G OSS"

Accessories
- Lens hood: bayonet, round (ALC-SH138)
- Case: pouch

History
- Introduction: 2015

Retail info
- MSRP: $1100 USD (as of 2015)

The Sony FE 90mm F2.8 Macro G OSS is a full-frame macro prime lens for the Sony E-mount, announced by Sony on 4 March 2015.

As of June 2017, the 90mm Macro lens is one of only 3 E-mount lenses manufactured by Sony that are specifically designed for macro photography, with the others being the Sony FE 50mm F2.8 Macro and Sony E 30mm F3.5 Macro lenses. Though designed for Sony's full frame E-mount cameras, this lens can be used on Sony's APS-C E-mount camera bodies, producing a field-of-view equivalent on full frame of 135mm.

== Build quality ==
The lens features a weather resistant plastic exterior with a matte black finish. The lens is currently the only Sony E-mount lens to feature an external focusing ring, which can be pulled up or down relative to the lens body to switch quickly between manual and autofocus. On the side of the lens are a pair of external switches controlling the lens' focusing range and image stabilization.

The lens' autofocus motor is fast and accurate on all Sony E-mount cameras, with only mild hunting when shooting at its closest focusing distance in low-light situations.

== See also ==
- List of Sony E-mount lenses
