= Sony α6600 =

2019 APS-C mirrorless camera

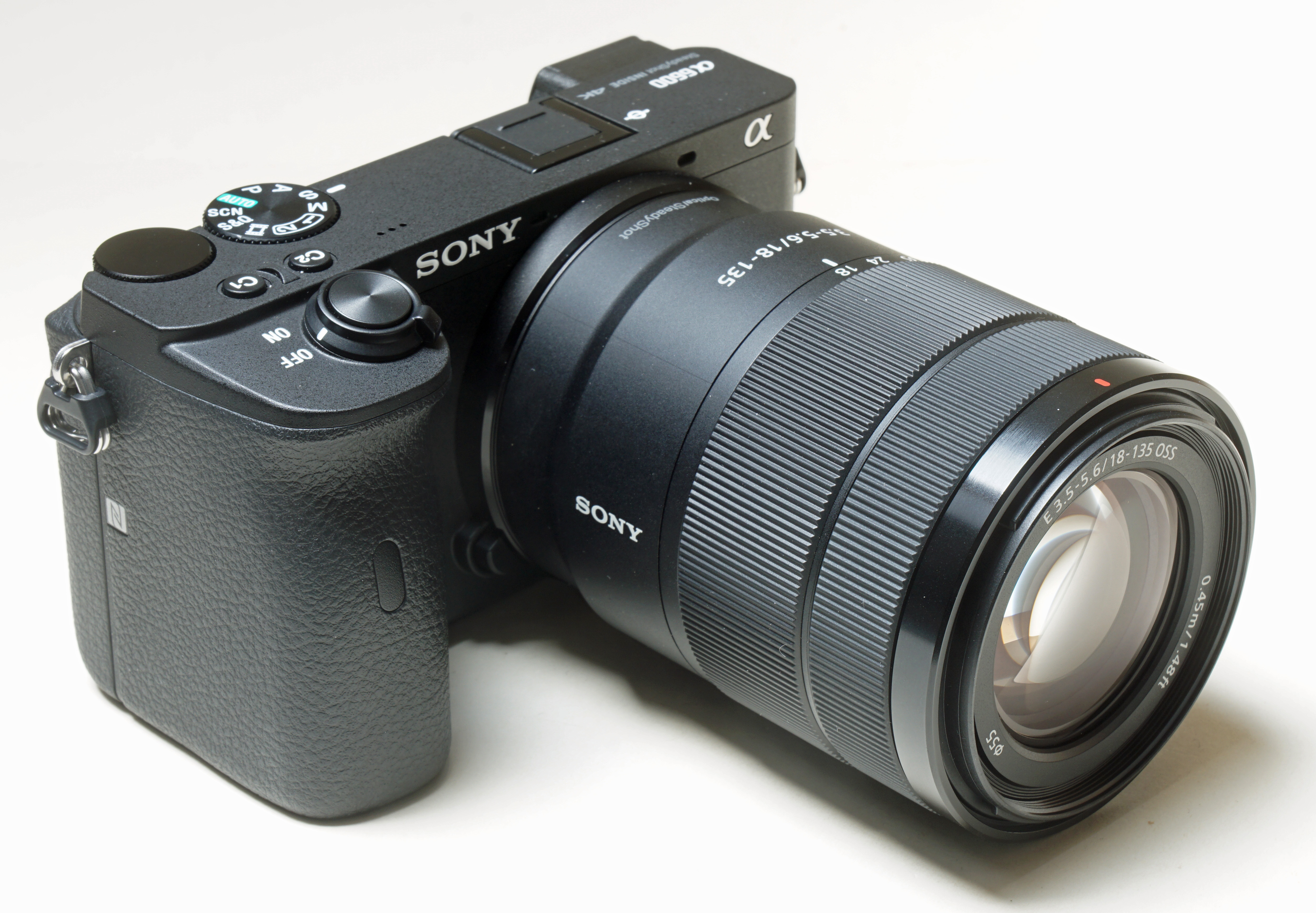
- A Sony α6600 body, pictured with an 18–135 mm kit lens

Overview
- Maker: Sony
- Type: Mirrorless interchangeable lens camera
- Released: August 2019
- Intro price: USD$1800 (with 18–135 mm kit lens)

Lens
- Lens mount: Sony E-mount
- Lens: interchangeable
- Compatible lenses: APS-C E-mount lenses

Sensor/medium
- Sensor type: Exmor HD CMOS
- Sensor size: 23.5 x 15.6 mm (APS-C type)
- Sensor maker: Sony Semiconductor Solutions Corporation
- Maximum resolution: 6000 x 4000 (24.2MP)
- Film speed: auto, 100–32000 (extend 50–102400)
- Recording medium: SD/SDHC/SDXC memory card

Focusing
- Focus areas: hybrid system, 425 phase detection points

Flash
- Flash: no
- Flash synchronization: 1/160 sec (with Sony flash)
- Flash bracketing: Multi Interface Shoe

Shutter
- Frame rate: up to 11 fps
- Shutter: mechanical, electronic
- Shutter speeds: 1/4000 to 30s, bulb
- Continuous shooting: 11 frame/s

Viewfinder
- Viewfinder: 1.0 cm electronic with 2.36M dots
- Viewfinder magnification: 1.07
- Frame coverage: 100%

Image processing
- Image processor: BIONZ X

General
- Video recording: 4K 24p (full width), 4K 30p (cropped)
- LCD screen: 75 mm (3.0 in) with 0.92M dots
- Battery: NP-FZ100 lithium-ion rechargeable battery
- AV port: HDMI type D (micro)
- Data port(s): USB 2.0 micro-B (480 Mbit/s), 2.4.GHz Wi-Fi, Bluetooth 4.1
- Dimensions: 120×67×69 mm (4.7×2.6×2.7 in)
- Weight: 503 g (18 oz)

Chronology
- Predecessor: Sony α6500
- Successor: Sony α6700

The Sony α6600 (model ILCE-6600) is a mirrorless APS-C format digital camera introduced in August 2019. It replaced the Sony α6500, launched in 2016, as Sony's flagship crop‑frame body. The camera reviewed well for its fast and accurate autofocus. Although primarily a stills camera, the α6600 can shoot video to good effect.

== Features ==
The camera features several relatively minor but nonetheless useful advancements from its Sony α6500 predecessor:

- a more ergonomic hand grip
- a tilting LCD screen (to facilitate vlogging)
- improved autofocus with 425 phase and 425 contrast detection points
- unlimited video recording (previously limited to 30 minutes)
- support for HDR video profiles (HLG, HLG1, HLG2, HLG3)
- Ø3.5mm stereo headphone output added
- in‑built flash removed
- now uses the higher capacity NP-FZ100 lithium-ion rechargeable battery

== Lens compatibility ==
Sony E-mount APS-C lenses are compatible with the α6600.

== See also ==
- List of Sony E-mount cameras
- Sony α6500
- Sony α6700

Family	Level	Format	'10	2011		2012	2013	2014	2015	2016	2017	2018	2019	2020	2021	2022	2023	2024	2025	2026
Alpha (α)	Indust	FF																ILX-LR1 ^{●}		
Alpha (α)	Cine line	FF													_{m} FX6 ^{●}					
Alpha (α)	Cine line	FF																		_{m} FX5 ^{AT●}
Alpha (α)	Cine line	FF													_{m} FX3 ^{AT●}					
Alpha (α)	Cine line	FF																		_{m} FX2 ^{AT●}
Alpha (α)	Flag	FF													_{m} α1 ^{FT●}				_{m} α1 II ^{FAT●}	
Alpha (α)	Speed	FF										_{m} α9 ^{FT●}			_{m} α9 II ^{FT●}				_{m} α9 III ^{FAT●}	
Alpha (α)	Sens	FF							_{m} α7S ^{●}	_{m} α7S II ^{F●}					_{m} α7S III ^{AT●}					
Alpha (α)	Hi-Res	FF						_{m} α7R ^{●}		_{m} α7R II ^{F●}		_{m} α7R III ^{FT●}		_{m} α7R IV ^{FT●}			_{m} α7R V ^{FAT●}			_{m} α7R VI ^{FAT●}
Alpha (α)	Basic	FF						_{m} α7 ^{F●}	_{m} α7 II ^{F●}				_{m} α7 III ^{FT●}			_{m} α7 IV ^{AT●}				_{m} α7 V ^{FAT●}
Alpha (α)	Compact	FF																_{m} α7CR ^{AT●}		
Alpha (α)	Compact	FF													_{m} α7C ^{AT●}			_{m} α7C II ^{AT●}		
Alpha (α)	Vlog	FF																_{m} ZV-E1 ^{AT●}		
Alpha (α)	Cine	APS-C															_{m} FX30 ^{AT●}			
Alpha (α)	Adv	APS-C			_{s} NEX-7 ^{F●}						_{m} α6500 ^{FT●}			_{m} α6600 ^{FT●}				_{m} α6700 ^{AT●}		
Alpha (α)	Mid-range	APS-C				_{m} NEX-6 ^{F●}					_{m} α6300 ^{F●}		_{m} α6400 ^{F+T●}							
Alpha (α)	Mid-range	APS-C						_{m} α6000 ^{F●}						_{m} α6100 ^{FT●}						
Alpha (α)	Vlog	APS-C														_{m} ZV-E10 ^{AT●}			_{m} ZV-E10 II ^{AT●}	
Alpha (α)	Entry-level	APS-C	NEX-5 ^{F●}	NEX-5N ^{FT●}		NEX-5R ^{F+T●}	NEX-5T ^{F+T●}		α5100 ^{F+T●}											
Alpha (α)	Entry-level	APS-C	NEX-3 ^{F●}	NEX-C3 ^{F●}		NEX-F3 ^{F+●}	NEX-3N ^{F+●}	α5000 ^{F+●}												
DSLR-style		APS-C					_{m} α3000 ^{●}		_{m} α3500 ^{●}											
SmartShot		APS-C							QX1 ^{M●}											
CineAlta	Cine line	FF										VENICE				VENICE 2				
CineAlta	Cine line	FF																BURANO		
XDCAM	Cine line	FF												_{m} FX9						
XDCAM	Docu	S35							_{m} FS7		_{m} FS7 II									
XDCAM	Mobile	S35								_{m} FS5			_{m} FS5 II							
NXCAM	Pro	S35		NEX-FS100		NEX-FS700	NEX-FS700R													
NXCAM	APS-C					NEX-EA50														
Handycam	FF					_{m} NEX-VG900														
Handycam	APS-C		_{s} NEX-VG10		_{s} NEX-VG20	_{m} NEX-VG30														
Security		FF									SNC-VB770									
Security		FF									UMC-S3C									
Family	Level	Format																		
Family	Level	Format	'10	2011		2012	2013	2014	2015	2016	2017	2018	2019	2020	2021	2022	2023	2024	2025	2026
