= Canon EOS DCS 3 =

1995 APS-C digital single-lens reflex camera

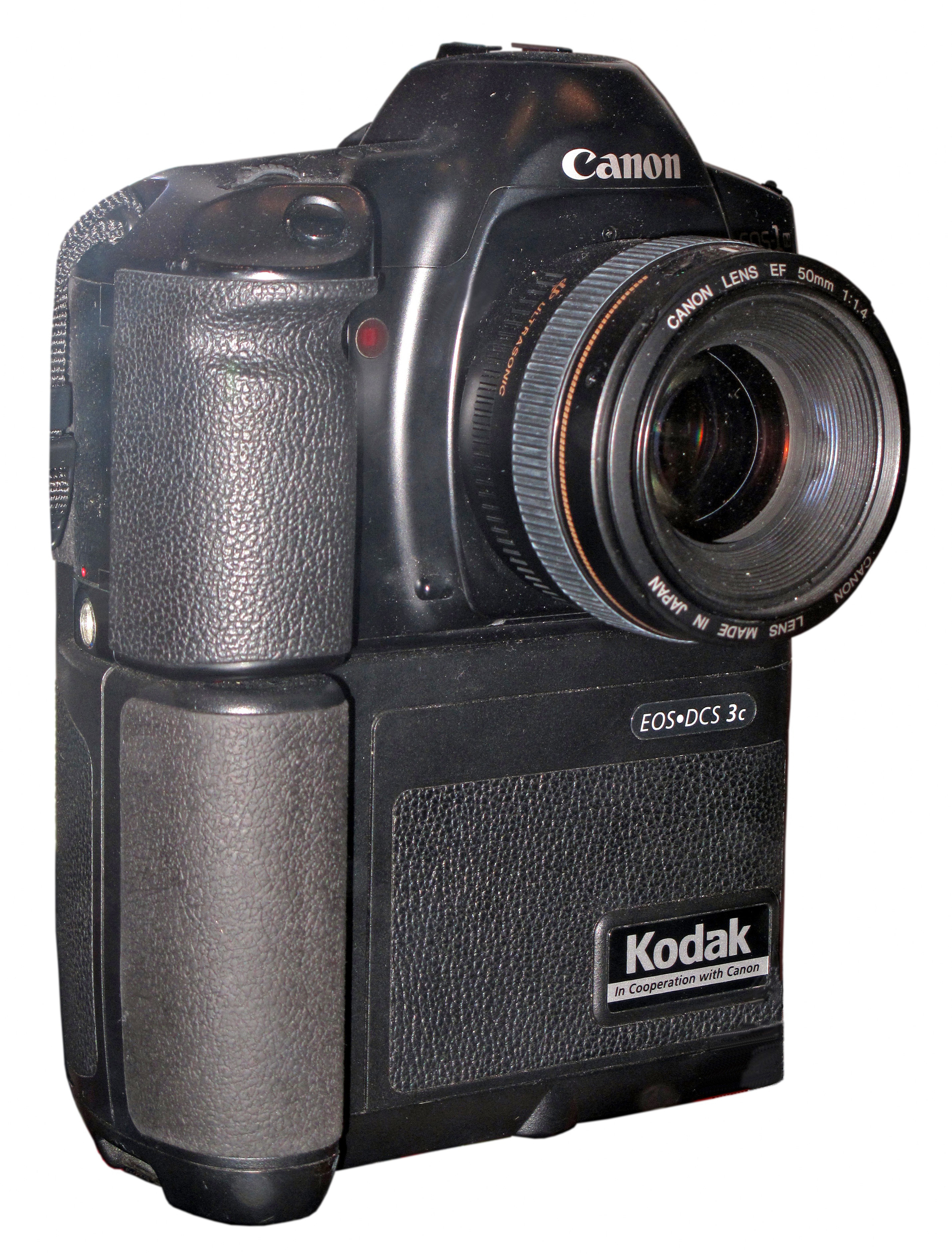

Overview
- Maker: Canon Inc.
- Type: Single-lens reflex with Digital back

Lens
- Lens: Interchangeable (EF)

Sensor/medium
- Sensor: CCD, 1.5x crop factor
- Maximum resolution: 1,268 x 1,012 (1.3 megapixels)
- Film speed: 200-1600 in 1 EV steps
- Storage media: PCMCIA card slot

Focusing
- Focus modes: One-shot, AI-Servo, AI-Focus, Manual
- Focus areas: 5 points
- Focus bracketing: none

Exposure/metering
- Exposure modes: Full auto, programmed, shutter-priority, aperture priority, manual
- Exposure metering: TTL, full aperture, zones
- Metering modes: Evaluative, Center Weighted, Average

Flash
- Flash: Canon hotshoe
- Flash bracketing: none

Shutter
- Shutter: electronic focal plane
- Shutter speed range: 30 to 1/8000 s
- Continuous shooting: up to 2.7 frame/s, max 8 frames

Viewfinder
- Viewfinder: Optical

Image processing
- White balance: 7 presets, including Auto and custom
- WB bracketing: none

General
- LCD screen: none
- Battery: Built-in, rechargeable
- Optional battery packs: none.
- Weight: 1,800 g (63 oz) (body only)

The Canon EOS DCS 3 was Kodak's second Canon based Digital SLR camera (a rebranded Kodak EOS-DCS 3) released in July 1995, four months after Kodak EOS-DCS 5. It uses a modified Canon EOS-1N film camera with a modified Kodak NC2000e digital camera back attached. As a result, it maintained the Canon EF lens mount, and full compatibility with all of Canon's EF lenses made until that time. The camera was followed by the six megapixel Canon EOS DCS 1, which was released later in December 1995.

The back had a then-massive 16MB of RAM to act as an image buffer, as well as a PCMCIA card slot for image storage, plus a SCSI socket for connection to a computer. The imaging element was an APS-C sensor with a 1.5x crop factor, and a resolution of 1268 x 1012 pixels (1.3 mp). The camera back did not have an LCD monitor.

A typical 260MB PCMCIA card or IBM Microdrive of the period could store 189 images. The EOS DCS 3 lacked any internal JPEG processing, and images had to be processed on a computer before they were usable in any form. The large amount of memory contributed to the then-immense price of the EOS DCS 3, at nearly two million yen.

The camera was succeeded by the Canon EOS D2000 (a rebranded Kodak DCS 520) in 1998.

== See also ==
- Kodak DCS

Type	Sensor	Class	00	01	02	03	04	05	06	07	08	09	10	11	12	13	14	15	16	17	18	19	20	21	22	23	24	25	26
DSLR	Full-frame	Flagship				1Ds		1Ds Mk II			1Ds Mk III					1D C													
DSLR	Full-frame	Flagship				1Ds		1Ds Mk II			1Ds Mk III				1D X					1D X Mk II ^{T}			1D X Mk III ^{T}						
DSLR	APS-H	Flagship			1D			1D Mk II	1D Mk II N		1D Mk III		1D Mk IV																
DSLR	Full-frame	Professional																	5DS / 5DS R										
DSLR	Full-frame	Professional							5D			_{x} 5D Mk II			_{x} 5D Mk III					5D Mk IV ^{T}									
DSLR	Full-frame	Advanced														_{x} 6D					_{x} 6D Mk II ^{AT}								
DSLR	APS-C	Advanced											_{x} 7D					_{x} 7D Mk II											
DSLR	APS-C	Mid-range						20Da								_{x} 60Da ^{A}													
DSLR	APS-C	Mid-range		D30	D60	10D		20D	30D		40D	_{x} 50D		_{x} 60D ^{A}			_{x} 70D ^{AT}		80D ^{AT}				90D ^{AT}						
DSLR	APS-C	Mid-range																	760D ^{AT}		77D ^{AT}								
DSLR	APS-C	Entry-level					300D	350D		400D	450D	_{x} 500D	_{x} 550D	_{x} 600D ^{A}		_{x} 650D ^{AT}	_{x} 700D ^{AT}		_{x} 750D ^{AT}		800D ^{AT}			850D ^{AT}					
DSLR	APS-C	Entry-level															_{x} 100D ^{T}		_{x} 200D ^{AT}				250D ^{AT}						
DSLR	APS-C	Entry-level										1000D		_{x} 1100D			_{x} 1200D			1300D		2000D							
DSLR	APS-C	Value																				4000D							
Early models			Canon EOS DCS 5 (1995); Canon EOS DCS 3 (1995); Canon EOS DCS 1 (1995); Canon EOS D2000 (1998); Canon EOS D6000 (1998)																										
Type	Sensor	Spec																											
Type	Sensor	Spec	00	01	02	03	04	05	06	07	08	09	10	11	12	13	14	15	16	17	18	19	20	21	22	23	24	25	26
