= Sony α6400 =

2019 APS-C mirrorless camera

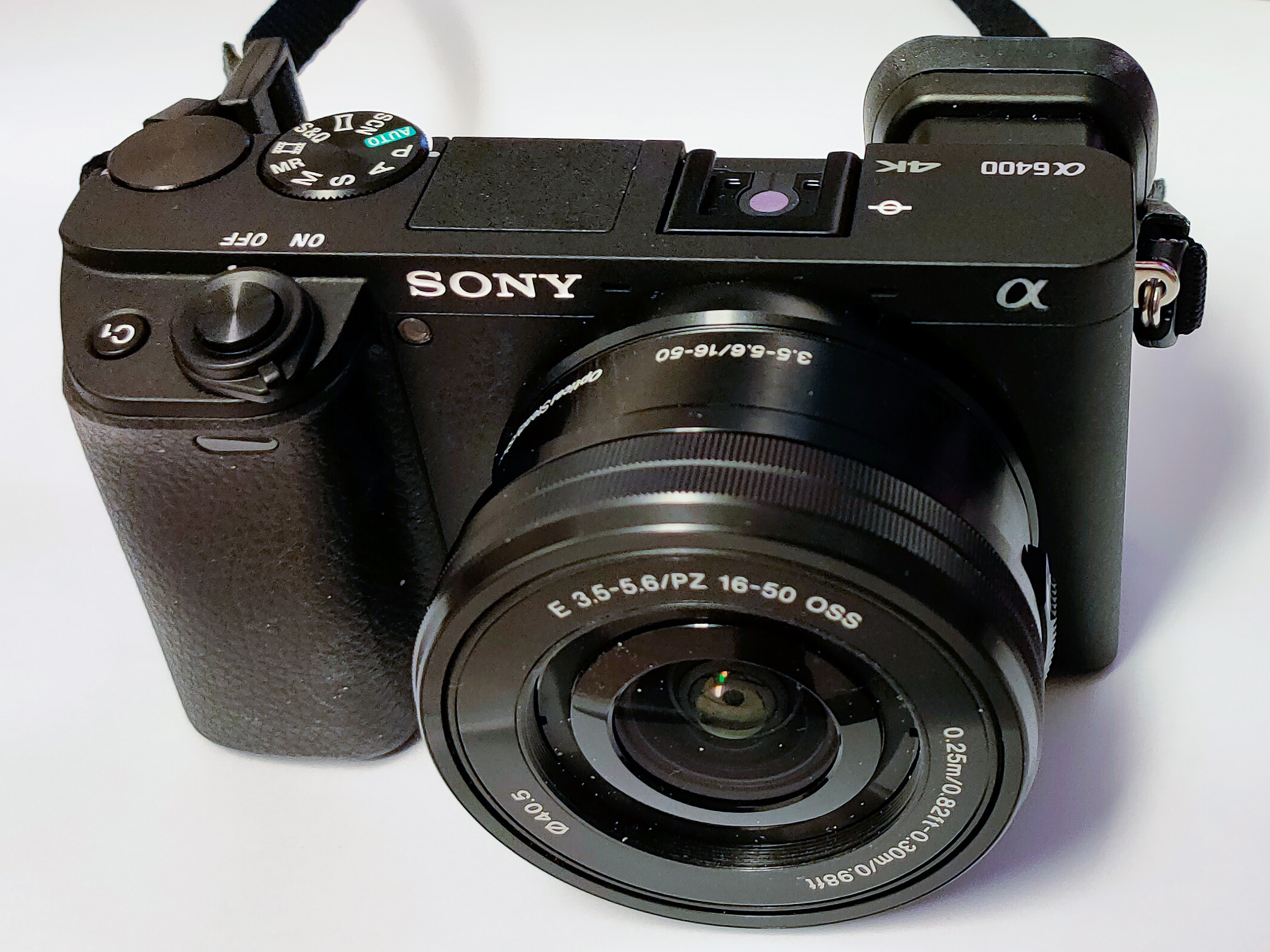

Overview
- Maker: Sony
- Type: Mirrorless interchangeable lens camera

Lens
- Lens mount: Sony E-mount

Sensor/medium
- Sensor: Exmor CMOS
- Sensor size: 23.5 × 15.6 mm (APS-C type)
- Maximum resolution: (3:2) 6000 × 4000 (24.2 MP)
- Film speed: Auto, 100 – 32000
- Recording medium: SD/ SDHC/SDXC, Memory Stick Pro Duo/ Pro-HG Duo

Focusing
- Focus areas: 425 focus points

Flash
- Flash: Incorporated flash (pop-out), hotshoe

Shutter
- Shutter speeds: 1/4000 s to 30 s
- Continuous shooting: 11 frame/s, 8 frame/s with silent shutter

Viewfinder
- Viewfinder: Built-in 2,359,296 dots OLED Electronic viewfinder
- Viewfinder magnification: 0.7
- Frame coverage: 100%

Image processing
- Image processor: Bionz X
- White balance: Yes

General
- LCD screen: 2.95 inches with 921,600 dots and 180-degree tilt-up functionality
- Battery: NP-FW50, InfoLITHIUM, 7.2 V, 1080 mAh, 7.7 Wh, lithium-ion rechargeable battery
- Body features: Anti Dust System
- Dimensions: 120 × 66.9 × 49.9 mm (4.8 × 2.8 × 2 inches)
- Weight: 403 g (14 oz) including battery

The Sony α6400 (model ILCE-6400) is a digital camera announced on January 15, 2019. It is an APS-C mirrorless interchangeable lens camera (MILC) designed to be a mid-range mirrorless camera and acts as the successor to the α6300. Intended to target the vlogging community, the α6400 features a flip-up screen and aggressive pricing. It features the same 24 megapixel sensor seen in the α6500. At the time of release, the two most capable cameras in the α6000 series of cameras were the α6400 and the α6500. The α6500 features in-body image stabilization and a larger image buffer, but the α6400 is arguably more advanced as the newer model. This is largely due to its increased processing power, real-time eye AF, and real-time tracking. These features, for example, cannot be added to the α6300 via a firmware update, as it would be too demanding on the processor.

At its announcement, the Sony α6400 is advertised as featuring the "world's fastest autofocus" with lag of 0.02 second and 11 fps continuous shooting with continuous AF and 8 fps with the silent shutter. Its MSRP is $899 for the body and $999 with a 16–50 mm power-zoom kit lens f/3.5-5.6.

Sony's α6400 also saw an upgrade to the photo sharing apps and the reintroduction of time-lapse videos via the menu system.

For videographers, a welcome change for the α6400 was the removal of the 30-minute record limit. This artificial limit was placed on many cameras possibly to avoid import taxes in the EU, but also to reduce the risk of damage from overheating. The α6400 is also a vast improvement for Sony with regard to overheating (most likely to occur whilst recording 4K due to the processing demands). Tests released online showed that in normal ambient temperatures, the battery will be discharged completely or the memory card will reach capacity before reaching abnormally high temperatures.

Firmware 2.0 was released for the α6400 on June 13, 2019, introducing animal-eye AF, the ability to use the wireless remote commander RMT-P1BT, as well as claimed stability improvements.

Sony A6400a and Sony A6100a were announced on January 3, 2025. These models first appeared on the Sony UK page. There were noticeably no differences between the core specifications of the new and old models.

== Features ==
- 24.2-megapixel Exmor CMOS sensor
- 425-point phase detection AF
- Real-time Eye AF; real-time tracking
- Super 35 mm format, 4K movie recording with full pixel readout and no pixel binning
- LCD touchscreen (2.95 inch) with 180-degree tilt up functionality
- 1.0 cm (0.39-inch) electronic viewfinder
- 1200-zone evaluative light metering
- Built-in Wi-Fi, NFC and Bluetooth
- LED-auto focus illuminator
- Continuous shooting: Hi+: 11 fps, Hi: 8 fps, Mid: 6 fps, Lo: 3 fps
- My Menu system
- Single memory card slot (UHS-1 compatible)
- Electronic shutter for silent shooting
- Interval Shooting (time-lapse)
- Animal Eye AF (with firmware v2.00)
- Compatibility with the wireless remote commander RMT-P1BT (firmware v2.0)

== Reception ==
After its announcement, numerous first impressions were released by popular YouTube vloggers and camera-focused channels. The Sony a6400 was well received being called the, "Best entry-level camera!" by Tony & Chelsea Northrup. The general consensus is that Sony priced it correctly, but for some, the lack of the new Z battery and the fact the flip-up screen blocks the hot shoe mount are odd choices.

== Remote Control and Apps ==
The camera is controllable remotely via Sony's Imaging Edge Mobile app. While this app allows for geotagging photos over Bluetooth, it omits altitude data and only latitude/longitude are available.

Third-party apps, such Alpha Focus Bracketing, expand functionality with features for creating focus-stacked images.

== See also ==
- List of Sony E-mount cameras
- Sony α6300
- Sony α6500
- Sony α7 III
- Sony α7r III
- Sony α9

Family	Level	Format	'10	2011		2012	2013	2014	2015	2016	2017	2018	2019	2020	2021	2022	2023	2024	2025	2026
Alpha (α)	Indust	FF																ILX-LR1 ^{●}		
Alpha (α)	Cine line	FF													_{m} FX6 ^{●}					
Alpha (α)	Cine line	FF													_{m} FX3 ^{AT●}					
Alpha (α)	Cine line	FF																		_{m} FX2 ^{AT●}
Alpha (α)	Flag	FF													_{m} α1 ^{FT●}				_{m} α1 II ^{FAT●}	
Alpha (α)	Speed	FF										_{m} α9 ^{FT●}			_{m} α9 II ^{FT●}				_{m} α9 III ^{FAT●}	
Alpha (α)	Sens	FF							_{m} α7S ^{●}	_{m} α7S II ^{F●}					_{m} α7S III ^{AT●}					
Alpha (α)	Hi-Res	FF						_{m} α7R ^{●}		_{m} α7R II ^{F●}		_{m} α7R III ^{FT●}		_{m} α7R IV ^{FT●}			_{m} α7R V ^{FAT●}			
Alpha (α)	Basic	FF						_{m} α7 ^{F●}	_{m} α7 II ^{F●}				_{m} α7 III ^{FT●}			_{m} α7 IV ^{AT●}				_{m} α7 V ^{FAT●}
Alpha (α)	Compact	FF																_{m} α7CR ^{AT●}		
Alpha (α)	Compact	FF													_{m} α7C ^{AT●}			_{m} α7C II ^{AT●}		
Alpha (α)	Vlog	FF																_{m} ZV-E1 ^{AT●}		
Alpha (α)	Cine	APS-C															_{m} FX30 ^{AT●}			
Alpha (α)	Adv	APS-C			_{s} NEX-7 ^{F●}						_{m} α6500 ^{FT●}			_{m} α6600 ^{FT●}				_{m} α6700 ^{AT●}		
Alpha (α)	Mid-range	APS-C				_{m} NEX-6 ^{F●}					_{m} α6300 ^{F●}		_{m} α6400 ^{F+T●}							
Alpha (α)	Mid-range	APS-C						_{m} α6000 ^{F●}						_{m} α6100 ^{FT●}						
Alpha (α)	Vlog	APS-C														_{m} ZV-E10 ^{AT●}			_{m} ZV-E10 II ^{AT●}	
Alpha (α)	Entry-level	APS-C	NEX-5 ^{F●}	NEX-5N ^{FT●}		NEX-5R ^{F+T●}	NEX-5T ^{F+T●}		α5100 ^{F+T●}											
Alpha (α)	Entry-level	APS-C	NEX-3 ^{F●}	NEX-C3 ^{F●}		NEX-F3 ^{F+●}	NEX-3N ^{F+●}	α5000 ^{F+●}												
DSLR-style		APS-C					_{m} α3000 ^{●}		_{m} α3500 ^{●}											
SmartShot		APS-C							QX1 ^{M●}											
CineAlta	Cine line	FF										VENICE				VENICE 2				
CineAlta	Cine line	FF																BURANO		
XDCAM	Cine line	FF												_{m} FX9						
XDCAM	Docu	S35							_{m} FS7		_{m} FS7 II									
XDCAM	Mobile	S35								_{m} FS5			_{m} FS5 II							
NXCAM	Pro	S35		NEX-FS100		NEX-FS700	NEX-FS700R													
NXCAM	APS-C					NEX-EA50														
Handycam	FF					_{m} NEX-VG900														
Handycam	APS-C		_{s} NEX-VG10		_{s} NEX-VG20	_{m} NEX-VG30														
Security		FF									SNC-VB770									
Security		FF									UMC-S3C									
Family	Level	Format																		
Family	Level	Format	'10	2011		2012	2013	2014	2015	2016	2017	2018	2019	2020	2021	2022	2023	2024	2025	2026
