= Samsung NX5 =

Digital camera model

Overview
- Maker: Samsung

Sensor/medium
- Sensor type: CMOS
- Sensor size: 23.4 x 15.6mm (APS-C type)
- Maximum resolution: 4592 x 3056 (15 megapixels)
- Recording medium: SD or SDHC card

Focusing
- Focus areas: 15 focus points

Shutter
- Shutter speeds: 1/4000s to 30s
- Continuous shooting: 3 frames per second

Viewfinder
- Viewfinder magnification: 0.86
- Frame coverage: 100%

Image processing
- Image processor: DRIM Engine
- White balance: Yes

General
- LCD screen: 3 inches with 230,000 dots
- Dimensions: 123 x 87 x 40mm (4.84 x 3.43 x 1.57 inches)
- Weight: 499 g (18 oz) including battery

The Samsung NX5 is an SLR-styled digital mirrorless system camera announced by Samsung on June 1, 2010. It was the second camera introduced that uses the Samsung NX mount for exchangeable lenses.

Level	2010		2011	2012	2013		2014	2015
High-End								NX1
Advanced	NX10		NX11	NX20			NX30	
Mid-range		NX100	NX200	NX210	NX300		NX300M	NX500
Mid-range							Galaxy NX	
Upper-entry						NX2000	NX3000	NX3300
Entry-level	NX5			NX1000	NX1100			
Compact-entry							NX mini	NX mini 2
