= Sony α6500 =

2016 APS-C mirrorless camera

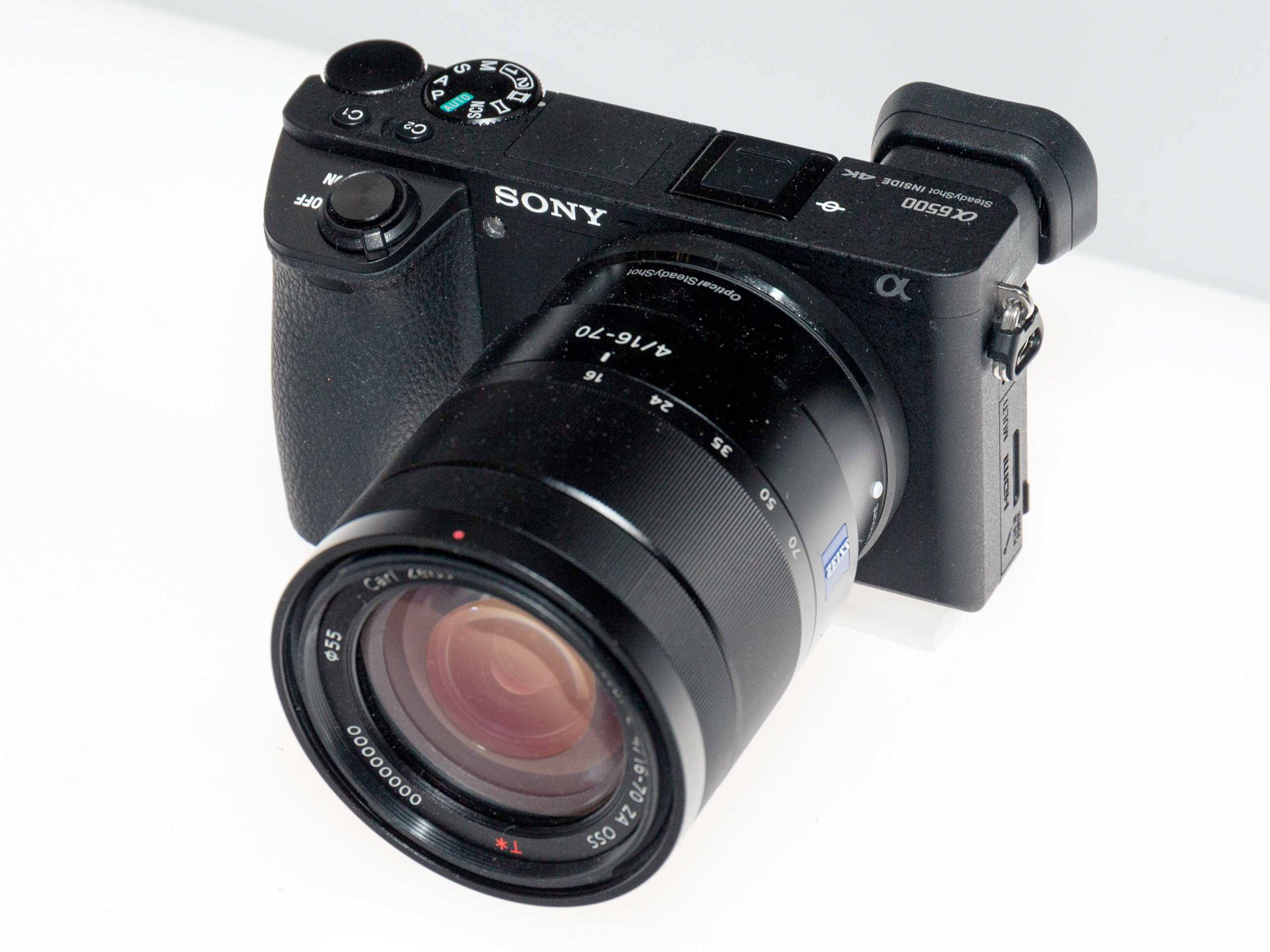
- α6500 with Sony 16-70mm F4 ZA lens

Overview
- Maker: Sony
- Type: Mirrorless interchangeable lens camera

Lens
- Lens mount: Sony E-mount

Sensor/medium
- Sensor type: Exmor HD CMOS
- Sensor size: 23.5 × 15.6 mm (APS-C type)
- Sensor maker: Sony
- Maximum resolution: (3:2) 6000 × 4000 (24.3 MP) (16:9) 6000 × 3375 (20.1 MP)
- Film speed: Auto, 100 – 25600 (51200)
- Recording medium: SD/ SDHC/SDXC, Memory Stick Pro Duo/ Pro-HG Duo

Focusing
- Focus areas: 425 focus points

Flash
- Flash: Hot shoe

Shutter
- Shutter speeds: 1/4000 s to 30 s
- Continuous shooting: 8 frame/s, 11 frame/s in speed priority mode

Viewfinder
- Viewfinder: Built-in 2.36 million dots OLED Electronic viewfinder
- Viewfinder magnification: 0.7
- Frame coverage: 100%

Image processing
- Image processor: BIONZ X with front-end LSI
- White balance: Yes

The Sony α6500 (model ILCE-6500) is a compact digital camera announced on 6 October 2016 shortly after photokina 2016.

The α6500 features a 24 megapixel Exmor sensor with 425 phase detection autofocus points. The camera is powered by Sony's Bionz X image processor with an ISO range up to 51,200. Additionally, the α6500 can shoot images at up to 11 frames per second with continuous autofocus and exposure tracking.

The mirrorless interchangeable lens camera (MILC) is also the first Sony model to integrate a 5-axis image stabilizator in a body with an APS‑C sensor. Sony claims an autofocus performance as short as 0.05 seconds.

== Lens compatibility ==
Sony E-mount lenses, both full-frame (FE) and APS-C (E) are compatible with the α6500.

== Mobile phone application ==
There is an application (Image Edge Mobile) that allows a user to control the Sony A6000-A6500 camera. The application also allows a user to transfer photos over wireless to the user's mobile phone.

== See also ==
- List of Sony E-mount cameras
- Sony α6000
- Sony α6300
- Sony α6400
- Sony α6600
- Sony α9

Family	Level	Format	'10	2011		2012	2013	2014	2015	2016	2017	2018	2019	2020	2021	2022	2023	2024	2025	2026
Alpha (α)	Indust	FF																ILX-LR1 ^{●}		
Alpha (α)	Cine line	FF													_{m} FX6 ^{●}					
Alpha (α)	Cine line	FF													_{m} FX3 ^{AT●}					
Alpha (α)	Cine line	FF																		_{m} FX2 ^{AT●}
Alpha (α)	Flag	FF													_{m} α1 ^{FT●}				_{m} α1 II ^{FAT●}	
Alpha (α)	Speed	FF										_{m} α9 ^{FT●}			_{m} α9 II ^{FT●}				_{m} α9 III ^{FAT●}	
Alpha (α)	Sens	FF							_{m} α7S ^{●}	_{m} α7S II ^{F●}					_{m} α7S III ^{AT●}					
Alpha (α)	Hi-Res	FF						_{m} α7R ^{●}		_{m} α7R II ^{F●}		_{m} α7R III ^{FT●}		_{m} α7R IV ^{FT●}			_{m} α7R V ^{FAT●}			_{m} α7R VI ^{FAT●}
Alpha (α)	Basic	FF						_{m} α7 ^{F●}	_{m} α7 II ^{F●}				_{m} α7 III ^{FT●}			_{m} α7 IV ^{AT●}				_{m} α7 V ^{FAT●}
Alpha (α)	Compact	FF																_{m} α7CR ^{AT●}		
Alpha (α)	Compact	FF													_{m} α7C ^{AT●}			_{m} α7C II ^{AT●}		
Alpha (α)	Vlog	FF																_{m} ZV-E1 ^{AT●}		
Alpha (α)	Cine	APS-C															_{m} FX30 ^{AT●}			
Alpha (α)	Adv	APS-C			_{s} NEX-7 ^{F●}						_{m} α6500 ^{FT●}			_{m} α6600 ^{FT●}				_{m} α6700 ^{AT●}		
Alpha (α)	Mid-range	APS-C				_{m} NEX-6 ^{F●}					_{m} α6300 ^{F●}		_{m} α6400 ^{F+T●}							
Alpha (α)	Mid-range	APS-C						_{m} α6000 ^{F●}						_{m} α6100 ^{FT●}						
Alpha (α)	Vlog	APS-C														_{m} ZV-E10 ^{AT●}			_{m} ZV-E10 II ^{AT●}	
Alpha (α)	Entry-level	APS-C	NEX-5 ^{F●}	NEX-5N ^{FT●}		NEX-5R ^{F+T●}	NEX-5T ^{F+T●}		α5100 ^{F+T●}											
Alpha (α)	Entry-level	APS-C	NEX-3 ^{F●}	NEX-C3 ^{F●}		NEX-F3 ^{F+●}	NEX-3N ^{F+●}	α5000 ^{F+●}												
DSLR-style		APS-C					_{m} α3000 ^{●}		_{m} α3500 ^{●}											
SmartShot		APS-C							QX1 ^{M●}											
CineAlta	Cine line	FF										VENICE				VENICE 2				
CineAlta	Cine line	FF																BURANO		
XDCAM	Cine line	FF												_{m} FX9						
XDCAM	Docu	S35							_{m} FS7		_{m} FS7 II									
XDCAM	Mobile	S35								_{m} FS5			_{m} FS5 II							
NXCAM	Pro	S35		NEX-FS100		NEX-FS700	NEX-FS700R													
NXCAM	APS-C					NEX-EA50														
Handycam	FF					_{m} NEX-VG900														
Handycam	APS-C		_{s} NEX-VG10		_{s} NEX-VG20	_{m} NEX-VG30														
Security		FF									SNC-VB770									
Security		FF									UMC-S3C									
Family	Level	Format																		
Family	Level	Format	'10	2011		2012	2013	2014	2015	2016	2017	2018	2019	2020	2021	2022	2023	2024	2025	2026
