= Sony FE 100-400mm F4.5 GM OSS =

- Maker: Sony
- Lens mount: Sony E-mount

Technical data
- Type: Zoom
- Focus drive: Linear motor
- Focal length: 100-400mm
- Image format: 35mm full-frame
- Aperture (max/min): f/4.5 (32.0)
- Close focus distance: 0.64m (@ 100mm)
- Max. magnification: 0.25x
- Diaphragm blades: 11
- Construction: 28 elements in 20 groups

Features
- Manual focus override: Yes Yes
- Weather-sealing: Yes Yes
- Lens-based stabilization: Yes Yes
- Aperture ring: No No
- Unique features: GM-series lens
- Application: Sports, Wildlife

Physical
- Max. length: 328mm
- Diameter: 120mm
- Filter diameter: 95mm (with additional 40.5mm rear drop-in filter)

History
- Introduction: 2026

Retail info
- MSRP: $4299 USD

The Sony FE 100-400mm F4.5 GM OSS is a premium, constant maximum aperture full-frame telephoto zoom lens for the Sony E-mount, announced by Sony on May 13, 2026.

Though designed for Sony's full frame E-mount cameras, the lens can be used on Sony's APS-C E-mount camera bodies, with an equivalent full-frame field-of-view of 150-600mm.

== Build quality ==
The lens showcases an off-white weather resistant plastic and metal exterior with a rubber focus and zoom ring. The lens features external controls for enabling image stabilization, limiting the focal range of the lens, and changing focusing modes. It also features four external focus-hold buttons for locking in focus on a subject in motion, plus a function ring.

The Sony FE 100-400mm 4.5 GMC lens is one of Sony's few telephoto lenses that are compatible with their own dedicated 1.4x and 2.0x lens teleconvertors. When equipped, the combination yields an effective focal length of 140-560mm and 200-800mm, respectively.

== See also ==
- List of Sony E-mount lenses
- Sony FE 100-400mm F4.5-5.6 GM OSS
- Sony FE 200-600mm F5.6-6.3 G OSS
- Sony FE 400-800mm F6.3-8 G OSS
- Sony FE 70-200mm F2.8 GM OSS
- Sony FE 70-300mm F4.5-5.6 G OSS
