= Sony FE 200-600mm F5.6-6.3 G OSS =

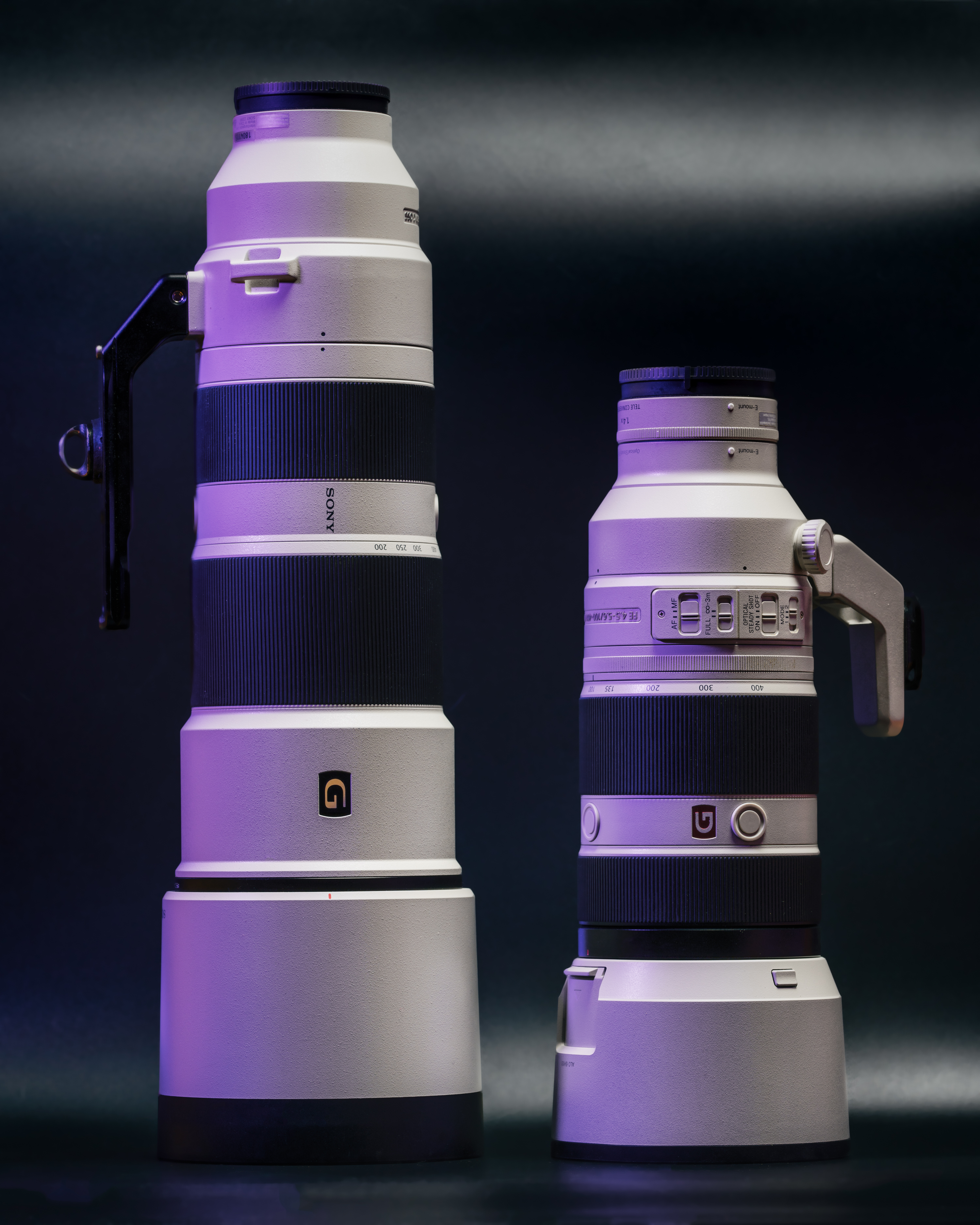
- Sony FE 200-600mm G (left) and FE 100-400mm GM with 1.4x TC (right)
- Maker: Sony
- Lens mount(s): Sony E-mount

Technical data
- Type: Zoom
- Focus drive: Stepper motor
- Focal length: 200-600mm
- Image format: 35mm full-frame
- Aperture (max/min): f/5.6 (32.0) - 6.3 (36.0)
- Close focus distance: 2.4 metres (7.9 ft)
- Max. magnification: (0.2x)
- Diaphragm blades: 11
- Construction: 24 elements in 17 groups

Features
- Manual focus override: Yes Yes
- Weather-sealing: Yes Yes
- Lens-based stabilization: Yes Yes
- Aperture ring: No No
- Unique features: G-series lens
- Application: Sports, Wildlife

Physical
- Max. length: 318 millimetres (12.5 in)
- Diameter: 111.5 millimetres (4.39 in)
- Weight: 2,115 grams (4.663 lb)
- Filter diameter: 95mm

Accessories
- Lens hood: ALC-SH157

History
- Introduction: 2019

The Sony FE 200-600mm F5.6-6.3 G OSS is a premium, variable maximum aperture full-frame telephoto zoom lens for the Sony E-mount, announced by Sony on June 11, 2019.

The Sony 200-600mm lens is currently the second longest focal length native zoom lens offered for the Sony E-mount, with the longest being the newly released 400-800mm. Though designed for Sony's full frame E-mount cameras, the lens can be used on Sony's APS-C E-mount camera bodies, with an equivalent full-frame field-of-view of 300-900mm.

== Build quality ==
The lens showcases an off-white weather resistant plastic and metal exterior with a rubber focus and zoom ring. The lens features external controls for enabling image stabilization, limiting the focal range of the lens, and changing focusing modes. It also features three external focus-hold buttons for locking in focus on a subject in motion. The lens does not change its physical length throughout its zoom range.

The Sony FE 200-600mm G lens is one of Sony's few telephoto lenses that are compatible with their own dedicated 1.4x and 2.0x lens teleconvertors. When equipped, the combination yields an effective focal length of 280-840mm and 400-1200mm, respectively.

== See also ==
- List of Sony E-mount lenses
- Sony FE 70-200mm F2.8 GM OSS
- Sony FE 70-300mm F4.5-5.6 G OSS
- Sony FE 100-400mm F4.5-5.6 GM OSS
