= A-mount =

A-mount or A mount may refer to:

- Minolta A-mount (α/Dynax/Maxxum), a partially electronic bayonet lens mount for 35mm film autofocus SLR cameras introduced by Minolta in 1985
- Agfa A-mount, the same mount by Agfa for the ActionCam in 1995
- Konica Minolta A-mount (α/Dynax/Maxxum), the same mount also for DSLRs between 2003 and 2006
- Sony A-mount (α), the same camera mount since 2006
- Hasselblad A-mount, the same camera mount for SLT cameras since 2014
- Carl Zeiss A-mount (ZA), lenses designed for A-mount cameras

== See also ==
- E-mount (disambiguation)
- V-mount (disambiguation)
