= Full frame =

Full frame may refer to:

- Full-frame camera, digital cameras with a 36 mm × 24 mm image sensor format
- 135 film, a photographic film format also known as 35mm film
- Full frame (cinematography), the equivalent format used for cinema
