= Sony FE 70–200 mm F4 Macro G OSS II =

Sony FE 70–200 mm F4 Macro G OSS II (SEL70200G2)
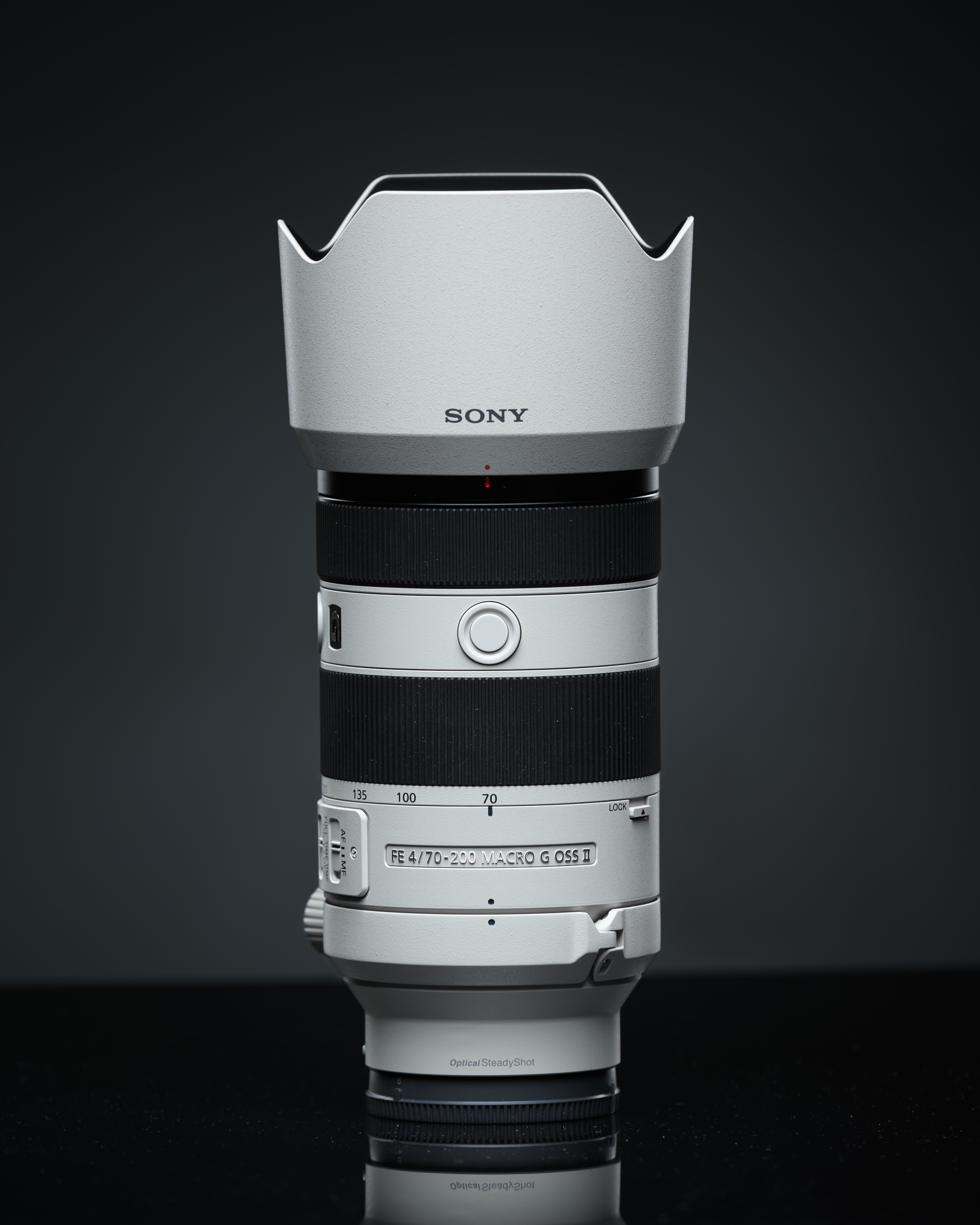
- Maker: Sony
- Lens mount: Sony E-mount

Technical data
- Type: Zoom
- Focal length: 70–200mm
- Image format: 35mm full-frame
- Aperture (max/min): f/4–20
- Close focus distance: 0.26 metres (0.85 ft)
- Max. magnification: 0.5 (1.0 with 2× teleconverter)
- Diaphragm blades: 9
- Construction: 19 elements in 13 groups

Features
- Manual focus override: Yes Yes
- Lens-based stabilization: Yes Yes
- Unique features: G-series lens
- Application: Landscape, Portrait, Macro

Physical
- Max. length: 149 millimetres (5.9 in)
- Diameter: 72 millimetres (2.8 in)
- Weight: 794 grams (1.750 lb)
- Filter diameter: 72mm

Accessories
- Lens hood: ALC-SH176 (blossom shape, bayonet)

Angle of view
- Horizontal: 34°–12.3° (70–200mm)

History
- Introduction: July 2023
- Discontinuation: still in production
- Successor: NV

The Sony FE 70–200 mm F4 Makro G OSS II is a full-frame constant maximum aperture, telephoto zoom lens for the Sony E-mount, released by Sony in July 2023. It can be considered as successor of the Sony FE 70-200mm F4 G OSS, but has a magnification of 0.5 and is branded as macro lens.

== Features ==
The name already reveals some features, such as the continuous aperture of f/4, the integrated image stabilisation. It is the second generation of the lens type. Sony claims a maximum magnification ratio of 0.5. The lens is compatible with the teleconverters SEL14TC (98–280mm) and SEL20TC (140–400mm). The latter allows a maximum magnification ratio up to 1, making it a proper macro lens. Typical for revisions of Sony lenses, this model is smaller and lighter than its predecessor.

== Scope of delivery ==
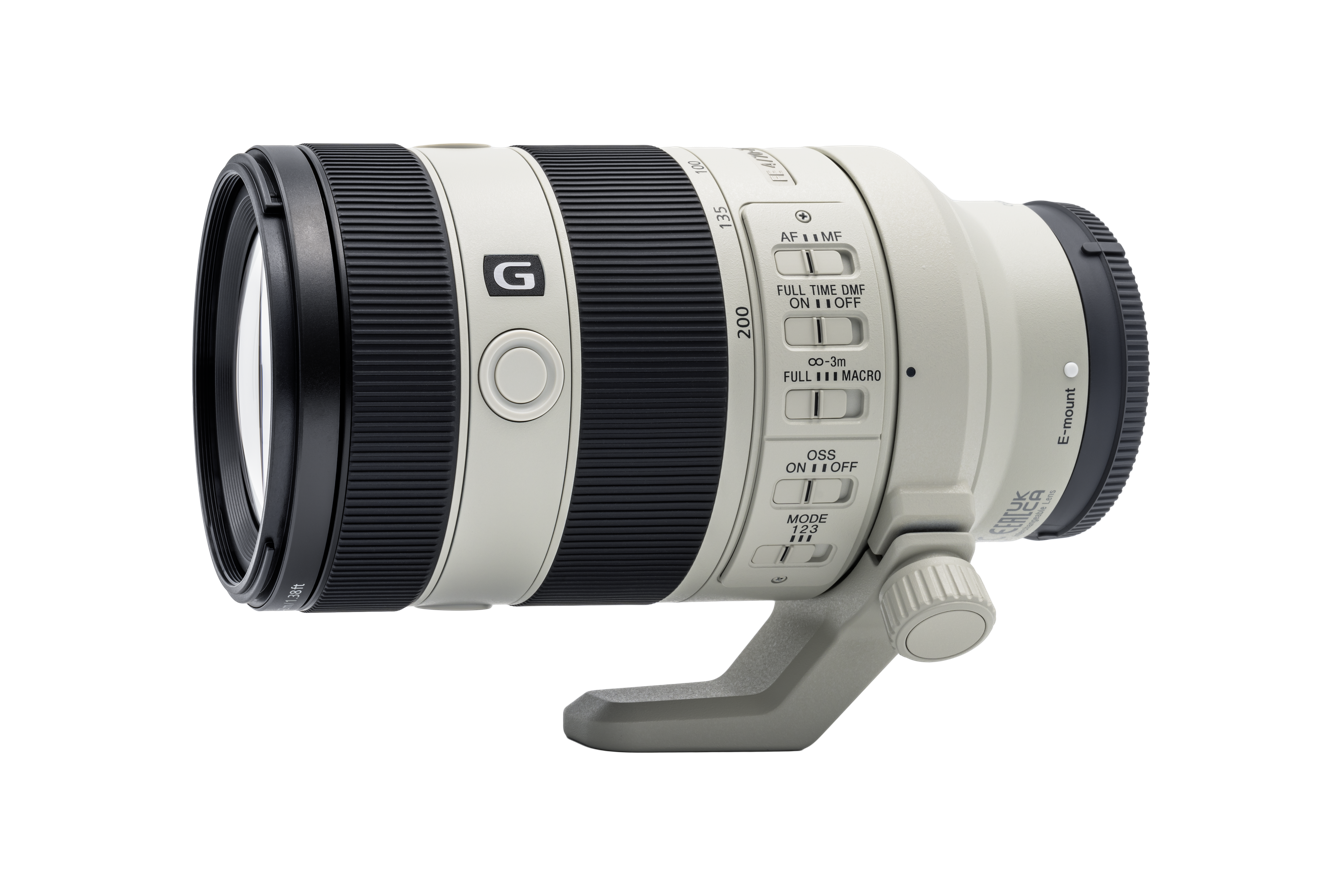
Lens mounted on a tripod clamp

The product contains the lens itself, a lens hood (ALC-SH176), front (ALC-F72S) and back (ALC-R1EM) lens cap and a tripod clamp. When mounted, it shifts the center of gravity on the tripod.

== Image quality ==
The lens offers a better image quality than its predecessor.

== Awards ==
The lens was awarded with the EISA Award 2024–2025 as the best product in the category Telephoto Zoom Lens and the TIPA World Awards 2024.

== See also ==
- List of Sony E-mount lenses
