= Nikon E series =

Series of digital SLR camera models

Nikon E series: E3/E3S
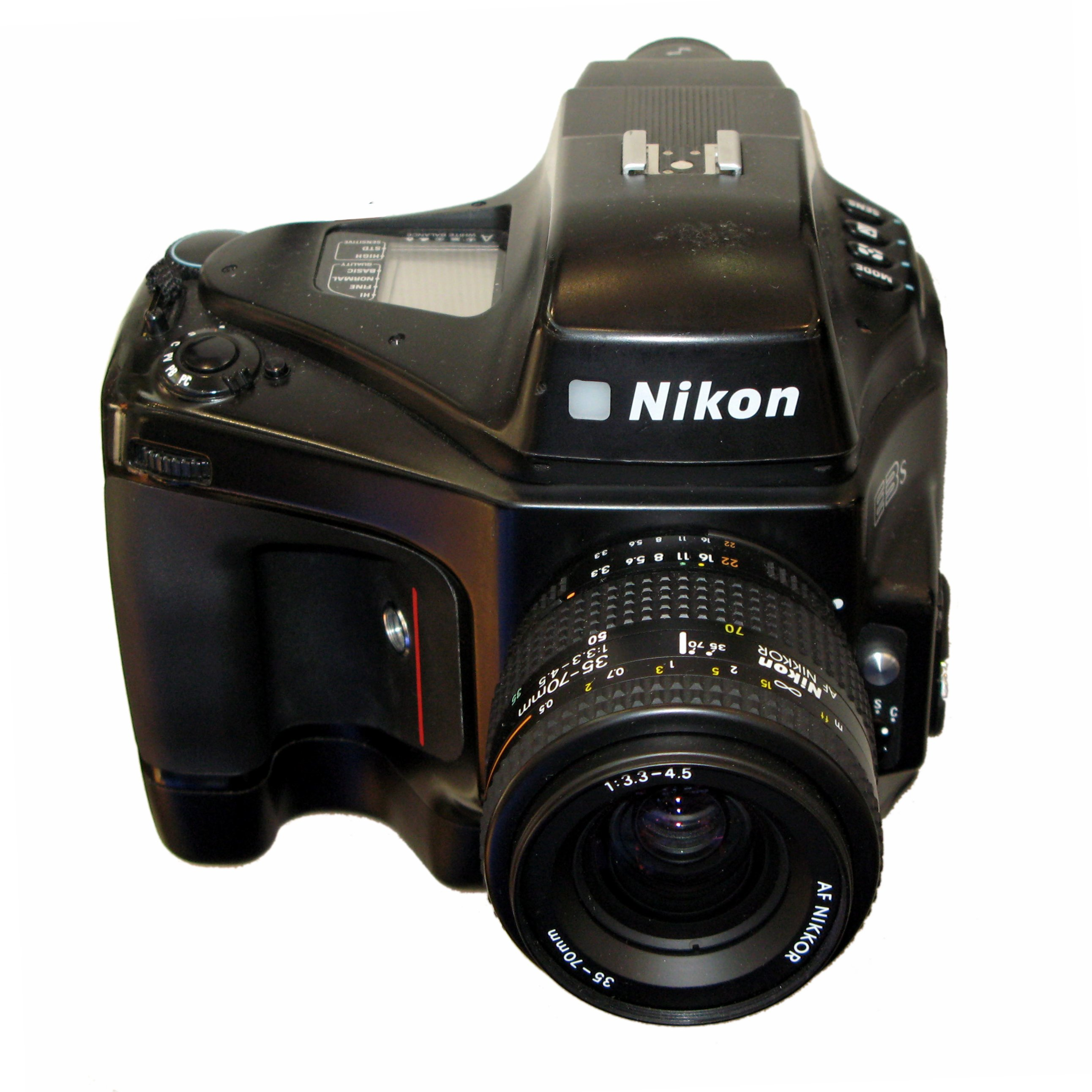

Overview
- Maker: Nikon
- Type: Digital single lens reflex camera

Lens
- Lens: Interchangeable, Nikon F mount

Sensor/medium
- Sensor: 2/3 inch CCD VT (vacant Transfer) type with reduction optical system
- Maximum resolution: 1.3 million pixels (1,280 X 1,000 array)
- Film speed: ISO equivalency 800, 1600 and 3200
- Storage media: PCMCIA Image Memory Card EC-15

Focusing
- Focus modes: Single-Servo Autofocus mode, Continuous-Servo Autofocus mode, Manual
- Focus areas: TTL phase detection system using Nikon Advanced AM200 autofocus module
- Focus bracketing: n/a

Exposure/metering
- Exposure modes: Program (P), Shutter-Priority AE (S), Aperture-Priority AE (A) and Manual (M)
- Exposure metering: Matrix Metering: EV 1 to 16-1/3, Center-Weighted Metering (70% centre): EV 1 to 20, Spot Metering: EV 2 to 20

Flash
- Flash: Speedlights supported, Standard TTL Flash possible
- Flash bracketing: n/a

Shutter
- Shutter speed range: 1/2 sec. to 1/2000
- Continuous shooting: E3: 1 frame/s E3s: 3 frame/s up to 12 images

Viewfinder
- Viewfinder: Optical type fixed eye level pentaprism Approx. 98% frame coverage, Approx. 0.7x magnification

Image processing
- White balance: Auto, Incandescent light (3,000k), Fluorescent light (6,700/5,000/4,200K), Fine weather (5,300K), Cloudy weadher (6,500K), Shade (8,000K), and Flash mode (5,700K).
- WB bracketing: Shoot 2 to 3 frames, each at a different exposure. Compensation value range of steps from ±1/4 to ±3/4. Select among 9 combinations.

General
- LCD screen: None
- Battery: Ni-MH Battery Pack EN-3
- Weight: approx. 1,850g
- Made in: Japan

The Nikon E series, co-developed with Fujifilm, are autofocus 1.3 megapixel professional grade quasi-full frame (35mm) Nikon F-mount digital single lens reflex cameras (DSLR) manufactured by Nikon since 1995.

The E series included the Nikon E2/E2S, Nikon E2N/E2NS and the Nikon E3/E3S. The S-variants are identical except they had triple the frame rate and a larger buffer.

Its optical system bundles the light of the full-frame lenses to the small 2/3 inch CCD sensor. It gives approximately 4 stops more light at the small sensor, delivering a minimum sensitivity of 800 and maximum 3200 ISO, which remains usable for press and news use.

== Technology ==
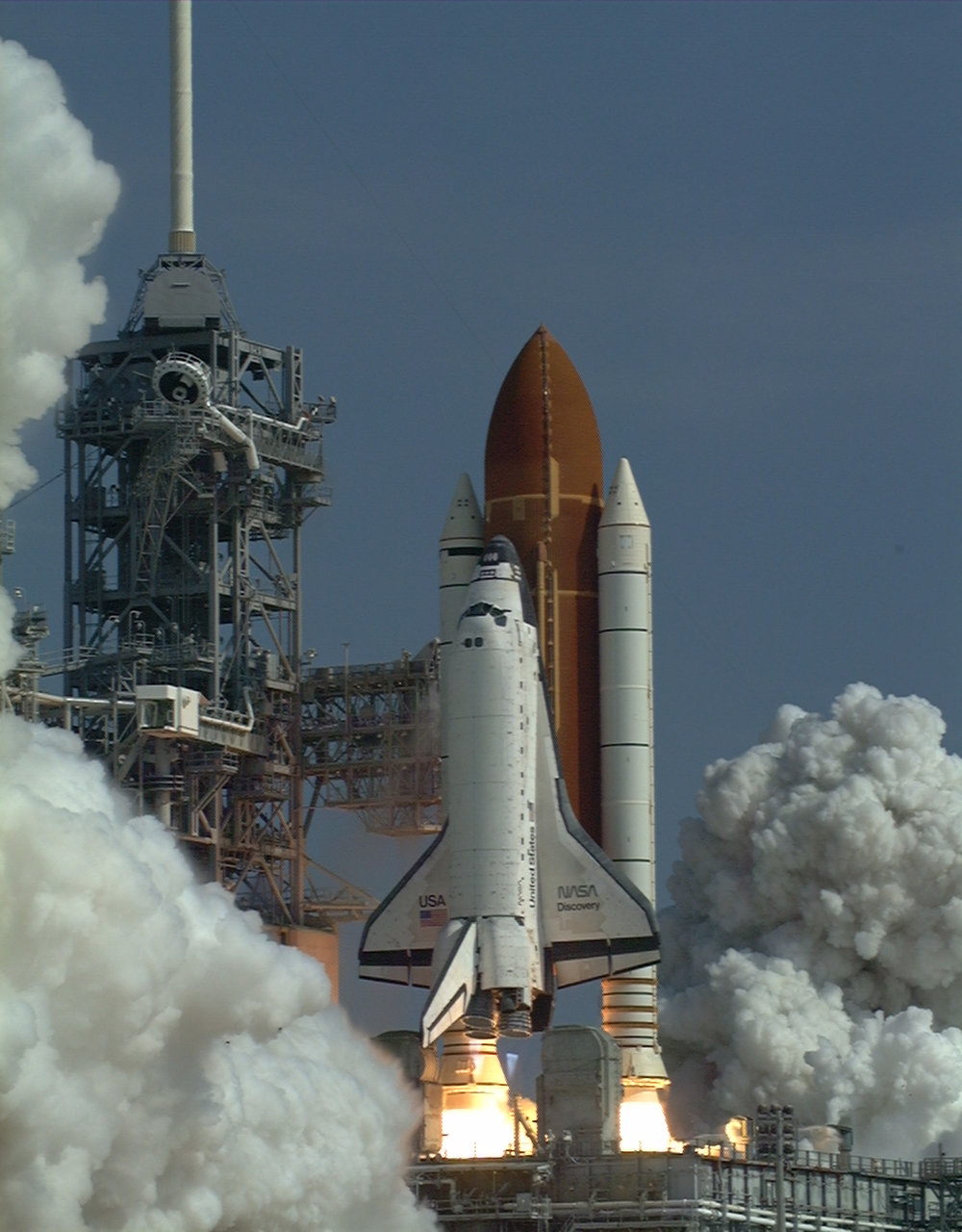
Space Shuttle STS-70 Launch. Taken with a Nikon E2: 1/2048 sec., f/16. Unknown ISO/ASA, but very high shutter speed even at a slow lens aperture.

The Nikon E2/E2S and E2N/E2NS use a Nikon F4 subsystem, while the E3/E3S uses a Nikon F100 subsystem.

=== Optical system ===
The E series uses a unique additional optical system that enables the small sensor to capture the field of view of a 35mm film, with a crop factor of 1. This comes not at the expense of the F-stop of the lenses, because the light is bundled to the 2/3 inch CCD sensor with approximately 16 times smaller area. The result is approximately 4 stops (2^{4} = 16) more light at the small sensor compared to a full-frame sensor. Therefore, the camera has a minimum full-frame sensitivity of ISO 800 which is equivalent to ISO 50 at 2/3 inch. As a result, the noise of the camera at ISO 800 full-frame is equivalent to ISO 50 of the 2/3 inch CCD sensor. Nikon could not reduce sensitivity below 800 ISO full-frame, because the little sensor will be overexposed below 50 ISO.

The exceptional high sensitivity up to 3200 ISO (equivalent 200 ISO, 2/3 inch) can be seen as an advantage for indoor or available light photography and is important for professional press and sports use, the customer target area.

Although the camera is small for a 1990s DSLR, the additional optical system makes the camera deeper compared to most later DSLRs.

All of the E series cameras use Nikon F-mount lenses.

=== Storage and replay ===
A PCMCIA compatible memory card is used. Images are digitally stored as uncompressed TIFF or compressed JPEG. It can be accessed via a SCSI connector. TV replay (NTSC or PAL) is possible.

== Variants ==
=== History ===
Nikon gained knowledge on digital cameras (still video cameras, with analog storage) by constructing the Nikon Still Video Camera (SVC) Model 1, a prototype which was first presented at Photokina 1986. This was followed by the Nikon QV-1000C Still Video Camera; it was produced beginning in 1988 mainly for professional press use. Both cameras used QV mount lenses, a variant of F-mount lenses. Via the optional Nikon QM-100 mount adapter, other Nikkor F-mount lenses can be fitted.

The Nikon NASA F4 was one of the first cameras with digital storage. Eastman Kodak used Nikon SLRs to design the Kodak DCS 100 and followers.

=== Nikon E2/E2S ===
This first variant was manufactured from 1995-1996 and was also available as Fujifilm Fujix DS-505 and DS-515.

The major difference between the E2 and the E2S was in the rate of shooting. The E2 could shoot at up to 1 fps, while the E2S (with better internal memory) could shoot at up to 3 fps.

=== Nikon E2N/E2NS ===
The E2N and E2NS were produced from 1996-1997, and were also available as the Fujifilm Fujix DS-505A and DS-515A.

The major difference between the E2N and the E2NS was in the rate of shooting. The E2N could shoot at up to 1 fps, while the E2NS (with better internal memory) could shoot at up to 3 fps.

=== Nikon E3/E3S ===
The Nikon E3 and Nikon E3S, co-developed with Fujifilm and marketed also as the Fujix DS-560 and Fujix DS-565, are autofocus 1.3 megapixel professional grade quasi-full frame (35mm) digital single lens reflex cameras (DSLR) announced by Nikon on 15 June 1998 and released in December 1999. The E3S is identical to the E3 except triple frame rate and larger buffer. They are the successors to the Nikon E2N/E2NS.

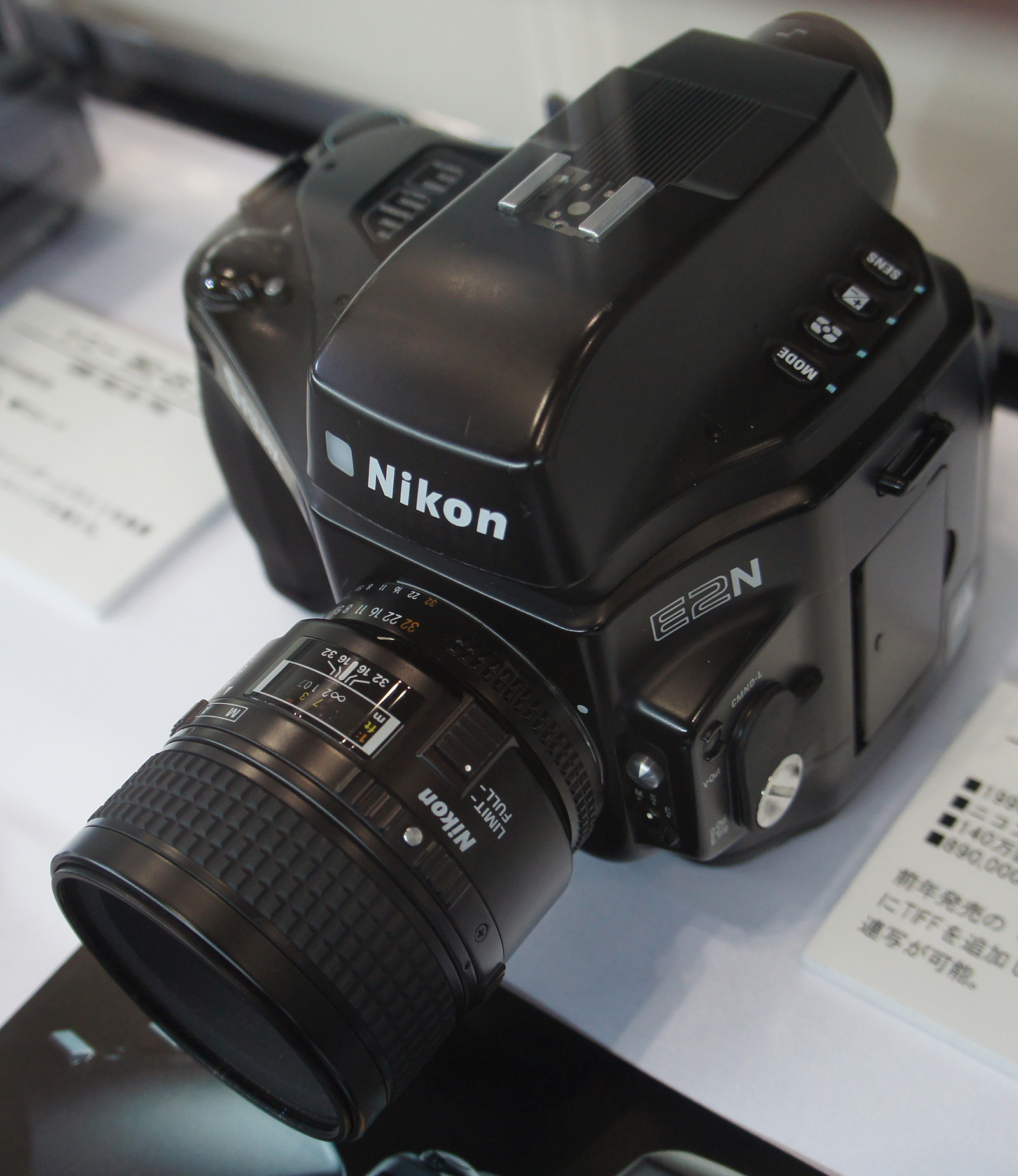

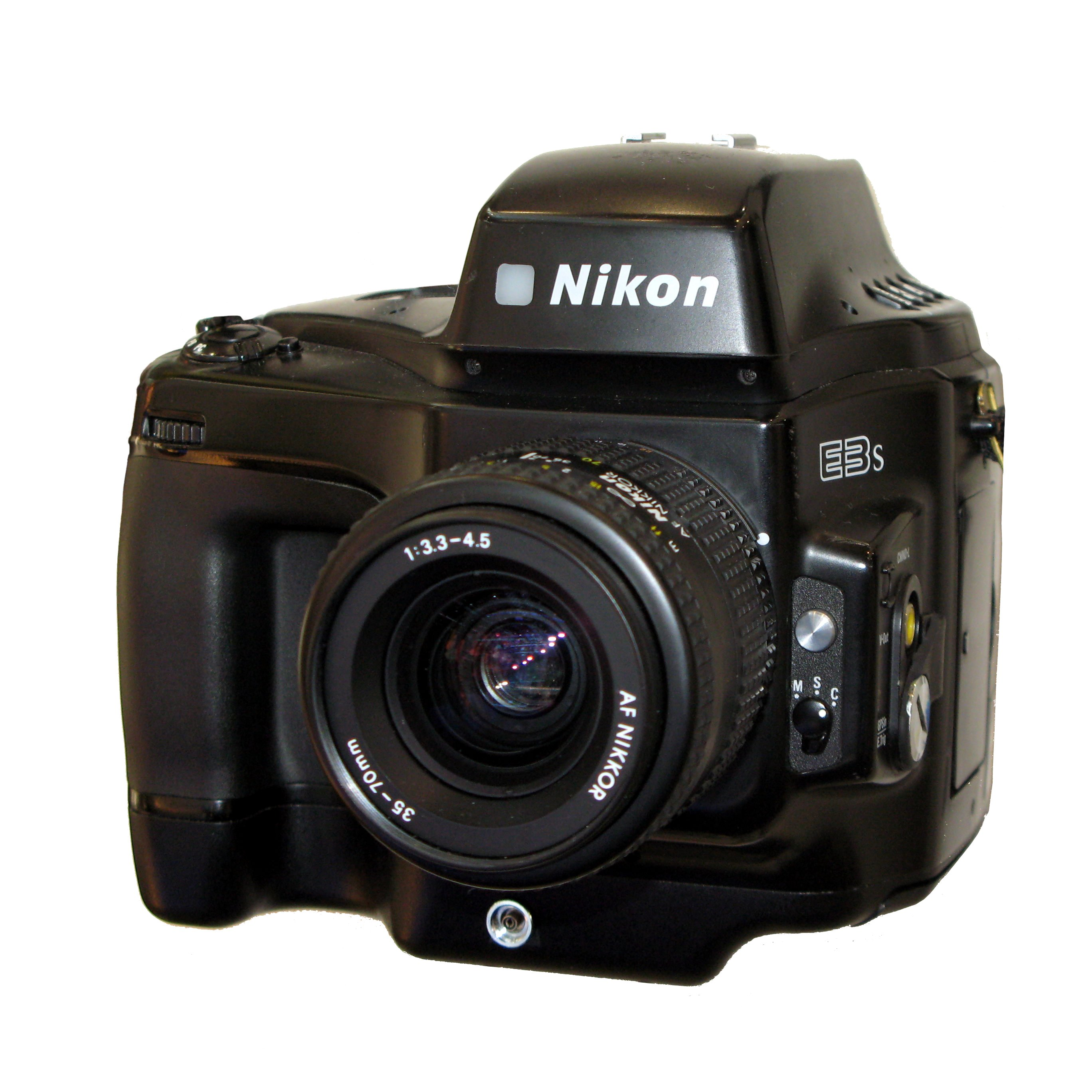

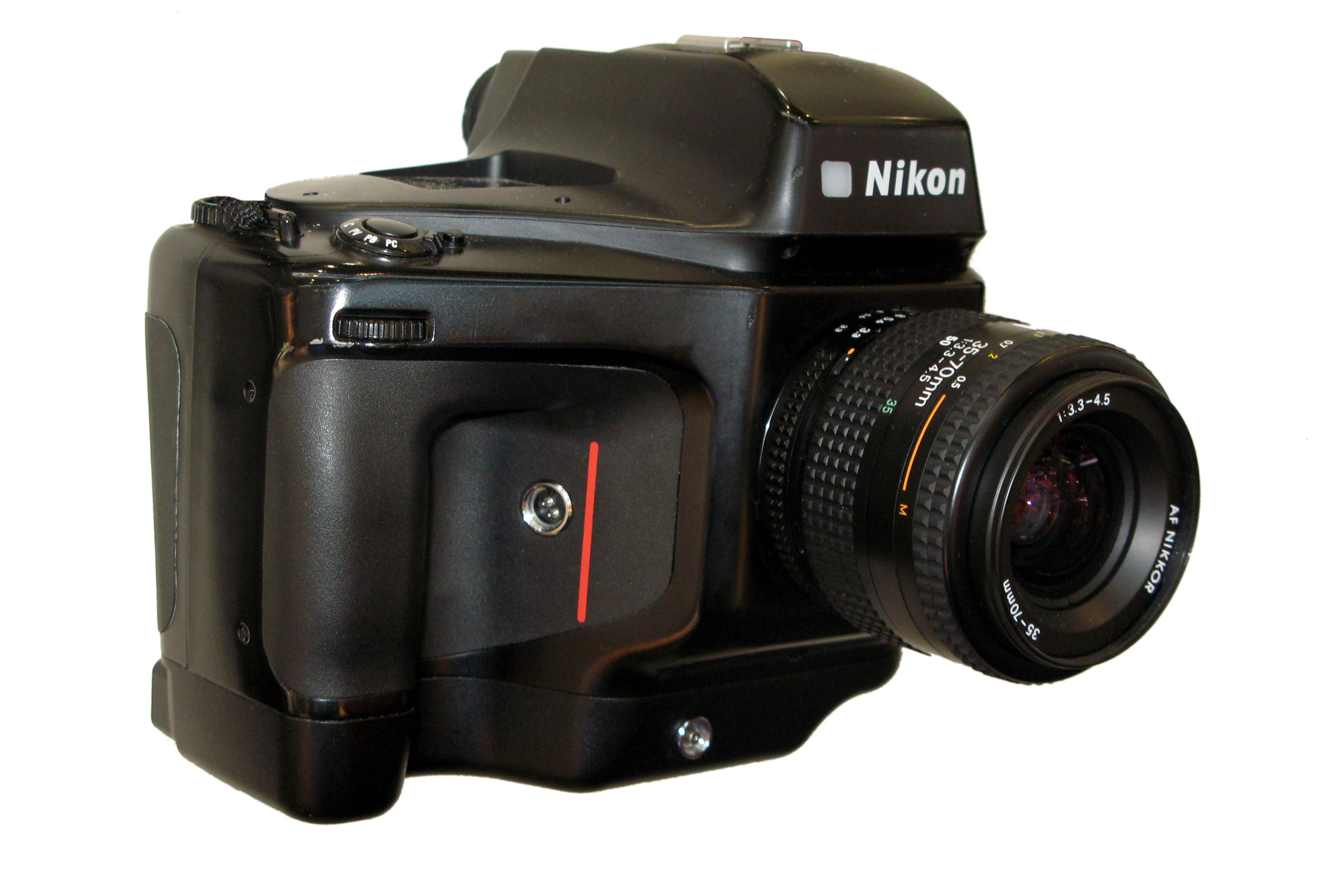

== See also ==
- Nikon NASA F4
- Minolta RD-175

Sensor	Class	1999	2000	2001	2002	2003	2004	2005	2006	2007	2008	2009	2010	2011	2012	2013	2014	2015	2016	2017	2018	2019	2020	2021	2022	2023	2024	2025	2026
FX (Full-frame)	Flagship											D3X ^{−P}																	
FX (Full-frame)	Flagship										D3 ^{−P}		D3S ^{−P}		D4		D4S		D5^{T}					D6^{T}					
FX (Full-frame)	Professional											D700 ^{−P}			D800/D800E			D810/D810A			D850 ^{AT}								
FX (Full-frame)	Enthusiast																Df												
FX (Full-frame)	Enthusiast																	D750 ^{A}					D780 ^{AT}						
FX (Full-frame)	Enthusiast															D600	D610												
DX (APS-C)	Flagship		D1^{−E}	D1X^{−E}				D2X^{−E}		D2Xs^{−E}																			
DX (APS-C)	Flagship		D1^{−E}	D1H ^{−E}			D2H^{−E}	D2Hs^{−E}																					
DX (APS-C)	Professional				D100^{−E}				D200^{−E}		D300^{−P}		D300S^{−P}						D500 ^{AT}										
DX (APS-C)	Enthusiast						D70^{−E}		D70s^{−E}	D80^{−E}		D90^{−E}		D7000 ^{−P}			D7100	D7200			D7500 ^{AT}								
DX (APS-C)	Upper-entry								D50^{−E}	D40X^{−E*}	D60^{−E*}		D5000^{A−P*}		D5100^{A−P*}	D5200^{A−P*}	D5300^{A*}	D5500^{AT*}		D5600 ^{AT*}									
DX (APS-C)	Entry-level									D40^{−E*}			D3000^{−E*}	D3100^{−P*}		D3200^{−P*}	D3300^{*}			D3400^{*}		D3500^{*}							
Early models		SVC (prototype; 1986); QV-1000C (1988); NASA F4 (1991); E2/E2S (1995); E2N/E2NS (1996); E3/E3S (1998)																											
Sensor	Class																												
Sensor	Class	1999	2000	2001	2002	2003	2004	2005	2006	2007	2008	2009	2010	2011	2012	2013	2014	2015	2016	2017	2018	2019	2020	2021	2022	2023	2024	2025	2026

Family	Level	Sensor	1998	1999	2000	2001	2002	2003	2004	2005	2006	2007	2008	2009	2010
Fujix	Professional	2/3 inch		DS-565											
Fujix	Professional	2/3 inch		DS-560											
FinePix	Industrial	APS-C										S3 Pro UVIR	IS Pro		
FinePix	Advanced	APS-C			S1 Pro		S2 Pro		S3 Pro			S5 Pro			
