= Sony FE 12-24mm F4 G =

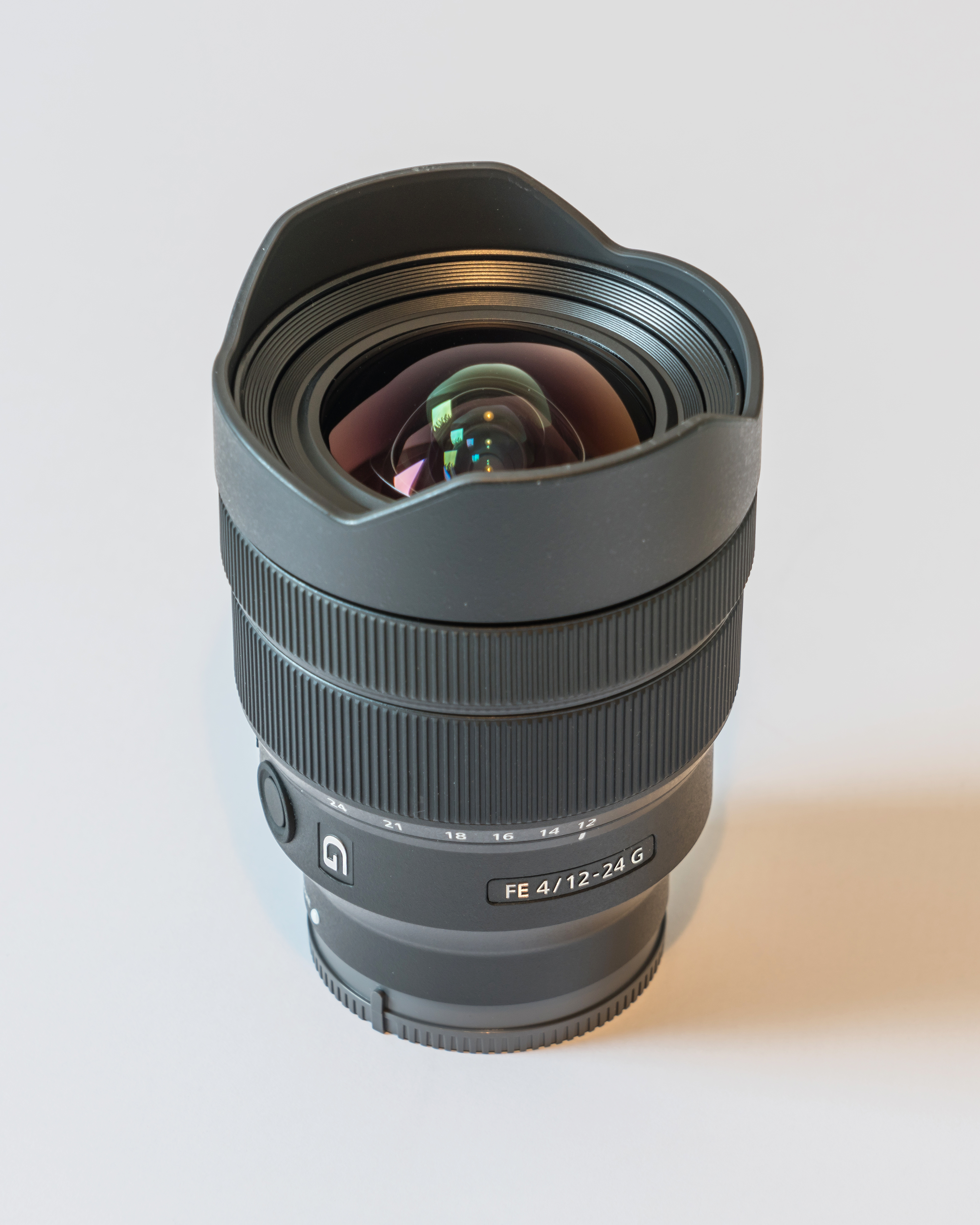
- Maker: Sony
- Lens mount(s): Sony E-mount

Technical data
- Type: Zoom
- Focal length: 12-24mm
- Image format: 35mm full-frame
- Aperture (max/min): f/4.0-22.0
- Close focus distance: 0.28 metres (0.92 ft)
- Max. magnification: 1:7 (0.14x)
- Diaphragm blades: 7
- Construction: 17 elements in 13 groups

Features
- Manual focus override: Yes Yes
- Weather-sealing: Yes Yes
- Lens-based stabilization: No No
- Aperture ring: No No
- Unique features: G-series lens
- Application: Landscape, Architectural

Physical
- Max. length: 117 millimetres (4.6 in)
- Diameter: 87 millimetres (3.4 in)
- Weight: 565 grams (1.246 lb)

Accessories
- Lens hood: Petal-shape

History
- Introduction: 2017

Retail info
- MSRP: $1699 USD

The Sony FE 12-24mm F4 G is a constant maximum aperture ultra wide-angle full-frame (FE) zoom lens for the Sony E-mount, announced by Sony on May 17, 2017. The lens is scheduled for release in Fall 2017.

The lens is currently Sony's widest-angle native zoom lens for Sony E-mount cameras. Though designed for Sony's full frame E-mount cameras, the lens can be used on Sony's APS-C E-mount camera bodies, with an equivalent full-frame field-of-view of 18-36mm.

== Build quality ==
The lens features a compact plastic construction with a matte black finish and the G-series badge on the side of the lens barrel. Just below the G-series badge is a programmable focus-hold button and an Autofocus-Manual focus switch. The lens does not feature image stabilization.

== See also ==
- List of Sony E-mount lenses
- Sony FE 16-35mm F4 ZA OSS
