= E-mount =

E-mount or E mount may refer to:

- Sony E-mount (part of α (Alpha), Handycam, NXCAM, XDCAM, Cyber-shot and SmartShot families), a fully electronic bayonet lens mount for mirrorless digital system cameras introduced by Sony in 2010
- Hasselblad E-mount, the same camera mount since 2013
- Carl Zeiss E-mount (ZA), lenses designed for E-mount cameras

== See also ==
- Mount E (Japanese: 恵山, romanized: E-san, lit. 'Mount Wisdom'), Kameda, Oshima, Hakodate, Hokkaido, Japan; a stratovolcano
- EF-mount
- A-mount (disambiguation)
- E (disambiguation)
