= Sony FE 70-200mm F4 G OSS =

Sony FE 70-200mm F4.0 G OSS
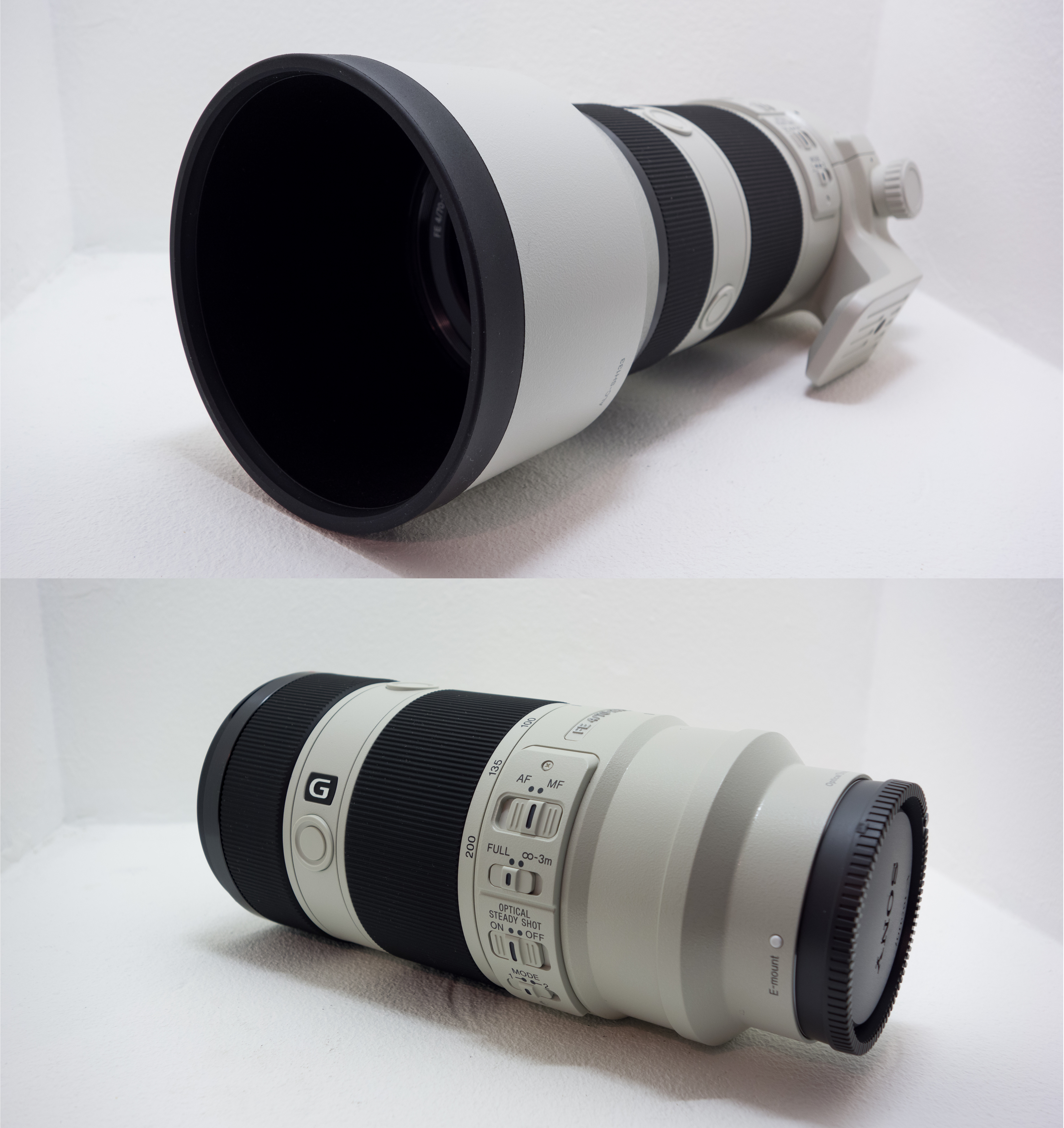
- Maker: Sony
- Lens mount(s): Sony E-mount

Technical data
- Type: Zoom
- Focus drive: Stepper motor
- Focal length: 70-200mm
- Image format: 35mm full-frame
- Aperture (max/min): f/4.0 - 22.0
- Close focus distance: 1.0 metre (3.3 ft)
- Max. magnification: 0.13
- Diaphragm blades: 9
- Construction: 21 elements in 15 groups

Features
- Manual focus override: Yes Yes
- Weather-sealing: Yes Yes
- Lens-based stabilization: Yes Yes
- Aperture ring: No No
- Unique features: G-series lens
- Application: Landscape, Portrait

Physical
- Max. length: 175 millimetres (6.9 in)
- Diameter: 80 millimetres (3.1 in)
- Weight: 840 grams (1.85 lb)
- Filter diameter: 72mm

History
- Introduction: 2014

Retail info
- MSRP: $1499 USD

The Sony FE 70-200mm F4.0 G OSS is a full-frame constant maximum aperture, telephoto zoom lens for the Sony E-mount, announced by Sony in 2013.

The 70-200mm F4.0 G lens is popular among weight-sensitive landscape photographers and hobbyists who want G-lens quality without spending thousands of dollars on a heavier, faster aperture telephoto lens.

Though designed for Sony's full frame E-mount cameras, the lens can be used on Sony's APS-C E-mount camera bodies, with an equivalent full-frame field-of-view of 105-300mm.

== Build quality ==
The lens showcases an off-white weather resistant plastic and metal exterior with a rubber focus and zoom ring. On the side of the lens is a set of external controls for enabling image stabilization, limiting the focal range of the lens, and changing focusing modes. It also features three external focus-hold buttons for locking in focus on a subject in motion. The lens maintains its physical length throughout its zoom range.

The lens is not compatible with Sony's 1.4x and 2.0x teleconvertors. It is physically impossible to properly mount them to the lens mount without damaging the rear lens element.

== Image quality ==
The lens is exceptionally sharp throughout its zoom range, with only a slight fall-off in acuity toward the edges of the frame at faster apertures. Distortion, vignetting, and chromatic aberration are all well controlled.

== See also ==
- List of Sony E-mount lenses
- Sony FE 70-200mm F2.8 GM OSS
- Sony FE 70-300mm F4.5-5.6 G OSS

Sony a-mount 70-200mm f2.8 G SSM Sony a-mount 70-200mm f2.8 G SSM II
