= Telecompressor =

A telecompressor or focal reducer is an optical element used to reduce focal length, increase lens speed, and in some instances improve optical transfer function (OTF) performance. It is also widely known under the name “Speed Booster”, which is the commercial name of a line of telecompressors by the manufacturer Metabones. Popular applications include photography, videography, and astrophotography. In astrophotography, these qualities are most desirable when taking pictures of nearby large objects, such as nebulae. The effects and uses of the telecompressor are largely opposite to those of the teleconverter or Barlow lens. A combined system of a lens and a focal reducer has smaller back focus than the lens alone; this places restrictions on lenses and cameras that focal reducer might be used with.

Lens adapters that include telecompressors are useful with digital mirrorless cameras. By combining a telecompressor within a lens adapter, mirrorless cameras can use the lenses of both digital single-lens reflex cameras (DSLRs) and film-based SLR (Single-lens reflex cameras).

Digital telecompressor (0,64x) for Canon EF lenses with Micro Four Thirds camera bodies

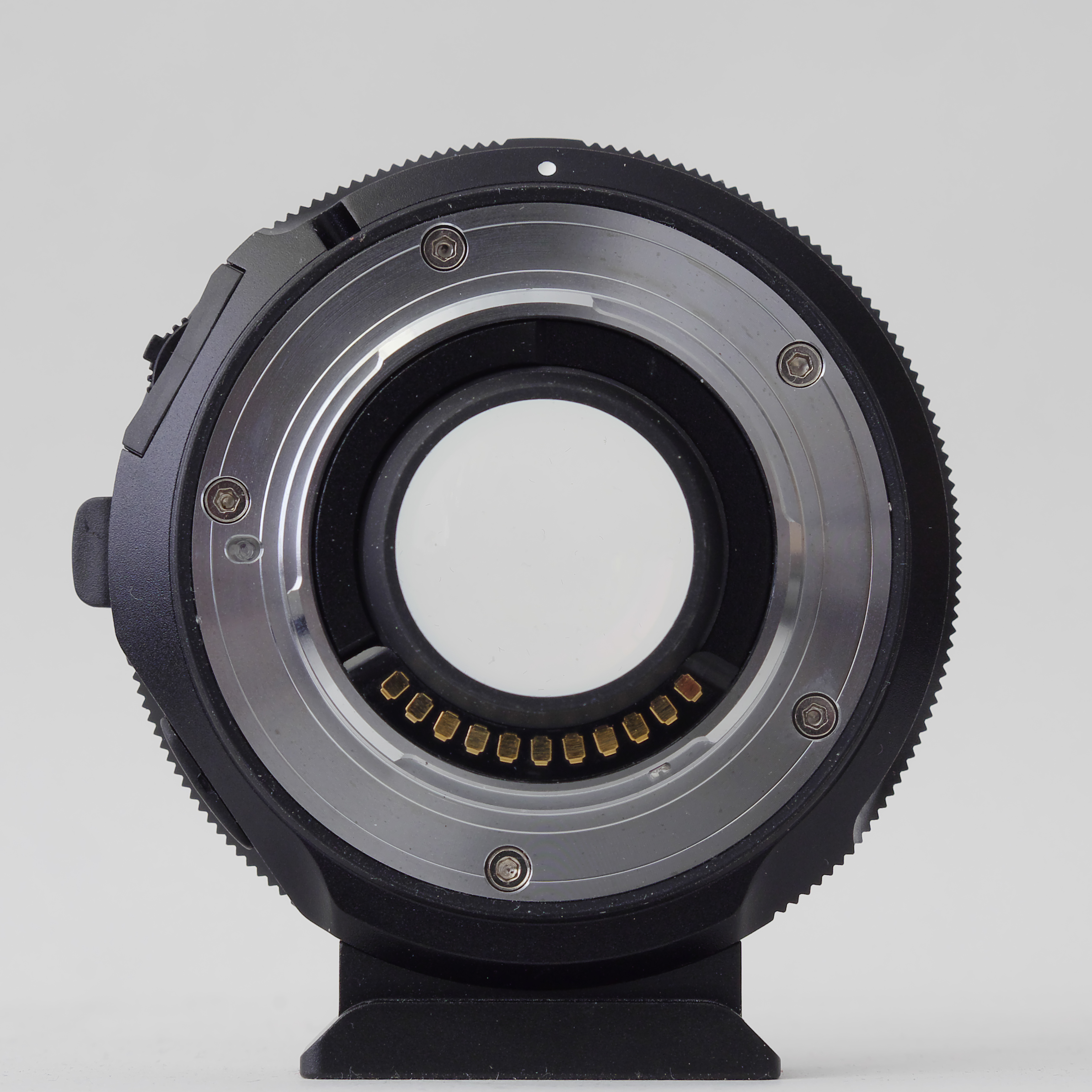
Mount for Micro Four Thirds camera bodies with eleven gold contacts

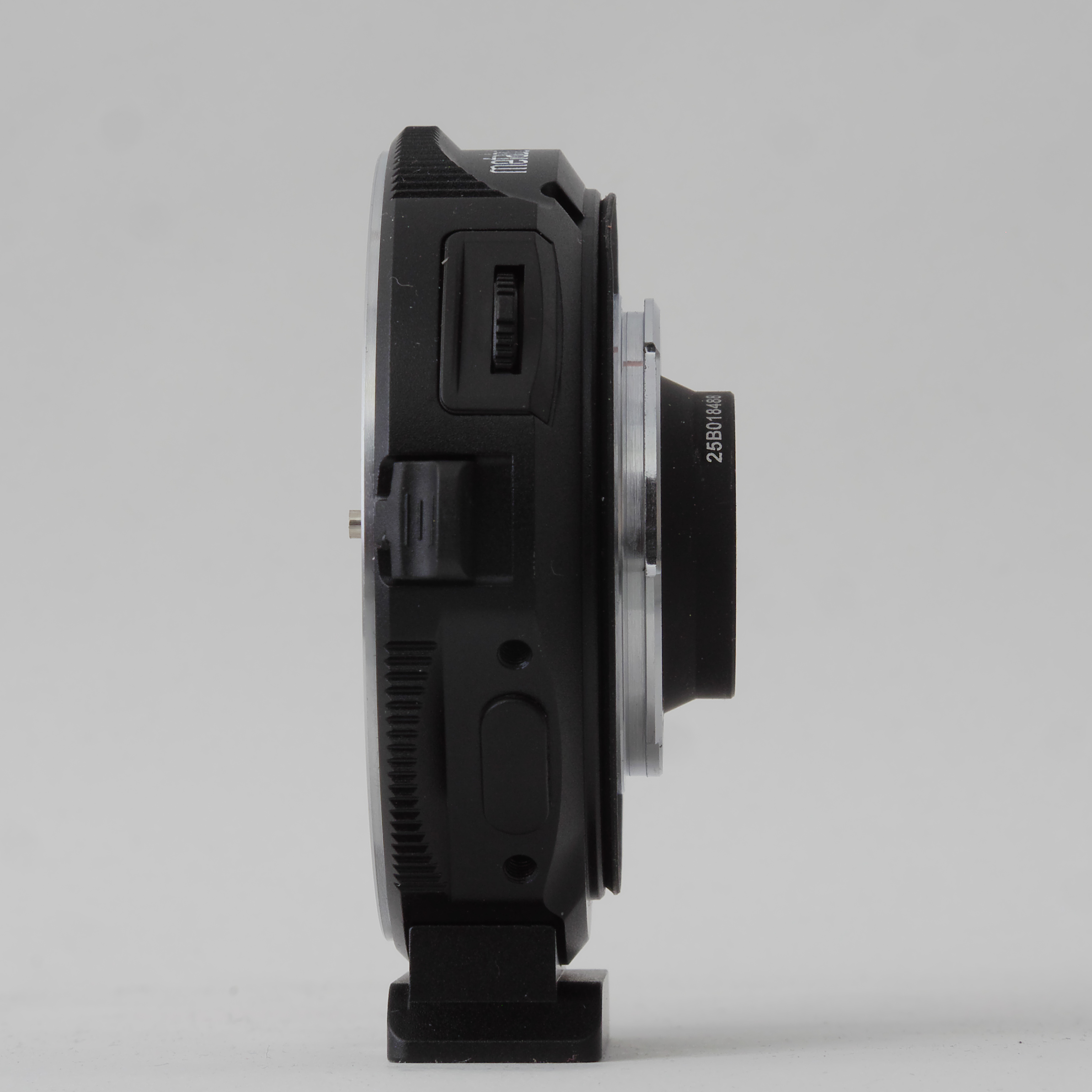
Side view with aperture control rocker (above optical axis) and USB socket with rubber cover (below optical axis)

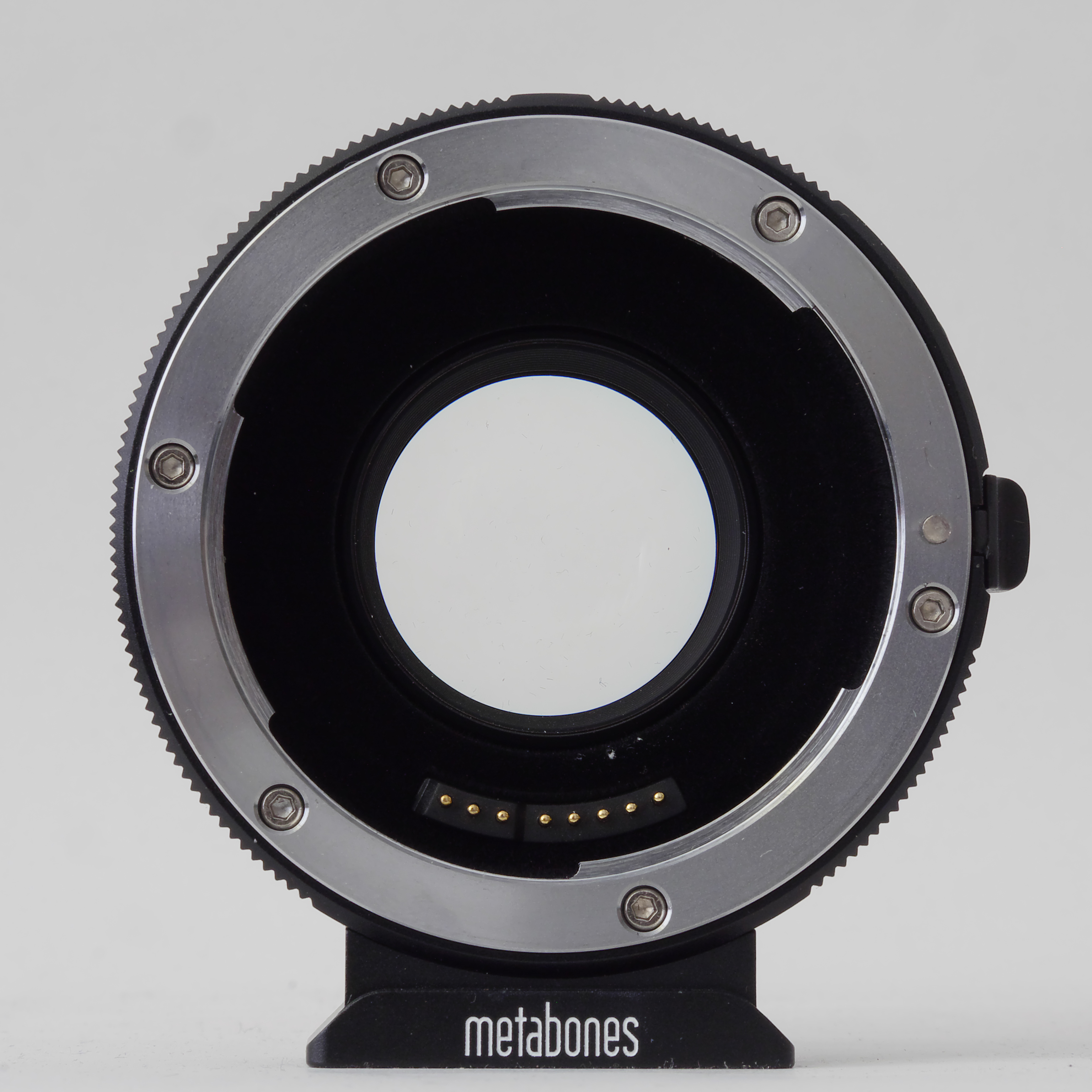
Mount for Canon EF lenses (full-format) with eight gold contacts

== Calculating focal reduction ==
For a refractor telescope or simple camera lens, the new effective focal length f_{n} is given by:

$${f_n} = {f_o} \left(1 - \frac{d}{f_r}\right),$$

where f_{o} = original focal length of telescope, d = distance from telecompressor to image plane, and f_{r} = focal length of telecompressor.

For a reflecting telescope, the calculation is the same. However, since the telecompressor increases the field of view, there could be vignetting in the image, depending on the sizes of the secondary mirror and the telescope tube.

For a catadioptric system that has a combination of mirror and lens, the determination of reduction is more complicated, due to the fact that the telescope has a variable focal length, where the imaging plane can move along the axis of the imaging system. As the addition of the telecompressor will increase the necessary back focus, the original focal length will increase by a certain amount, and then this new focal length would be used in the above formula.

== Keplerian (relay) telecompressors ==
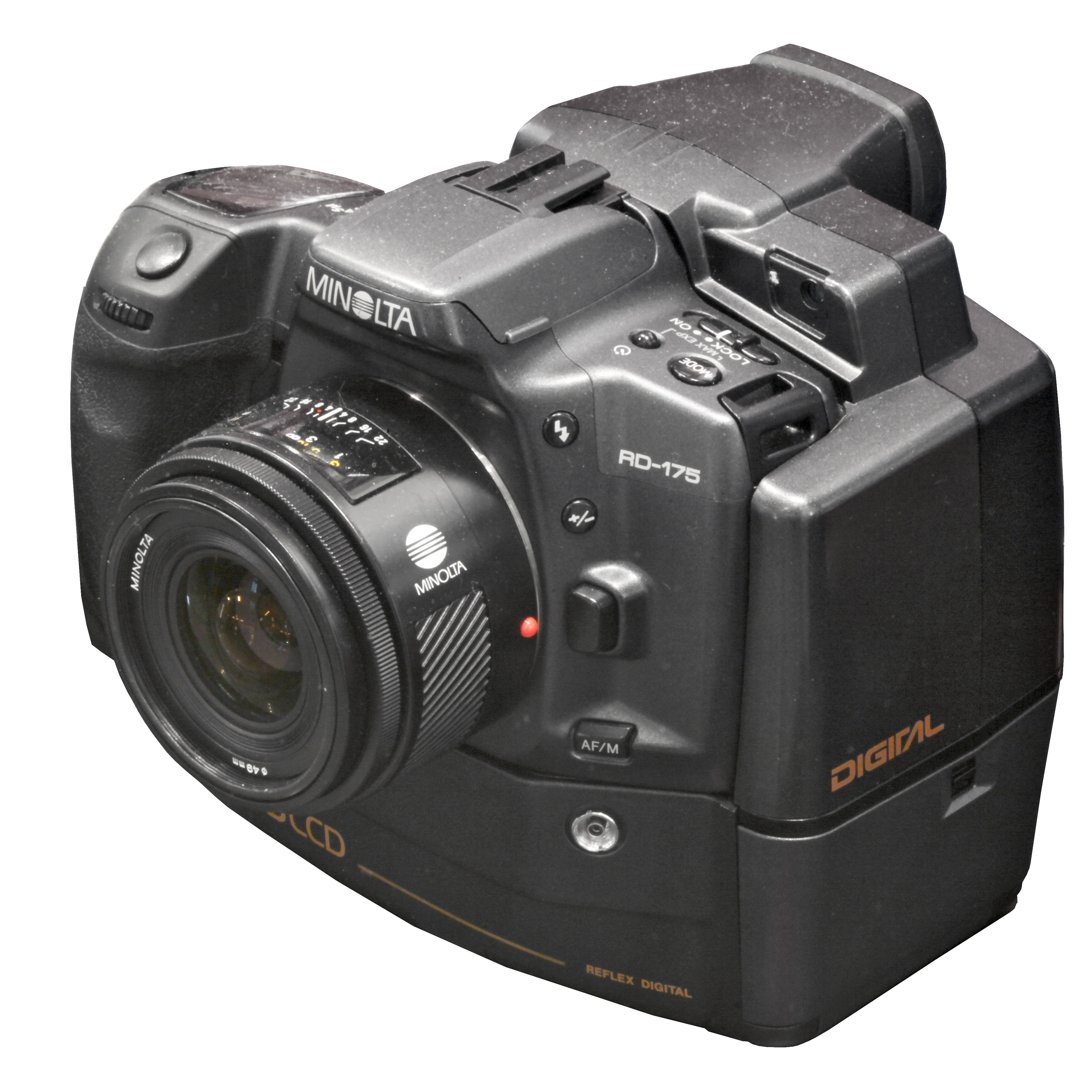
MINOLTA RD-175/Agfa ActionCam (1995)

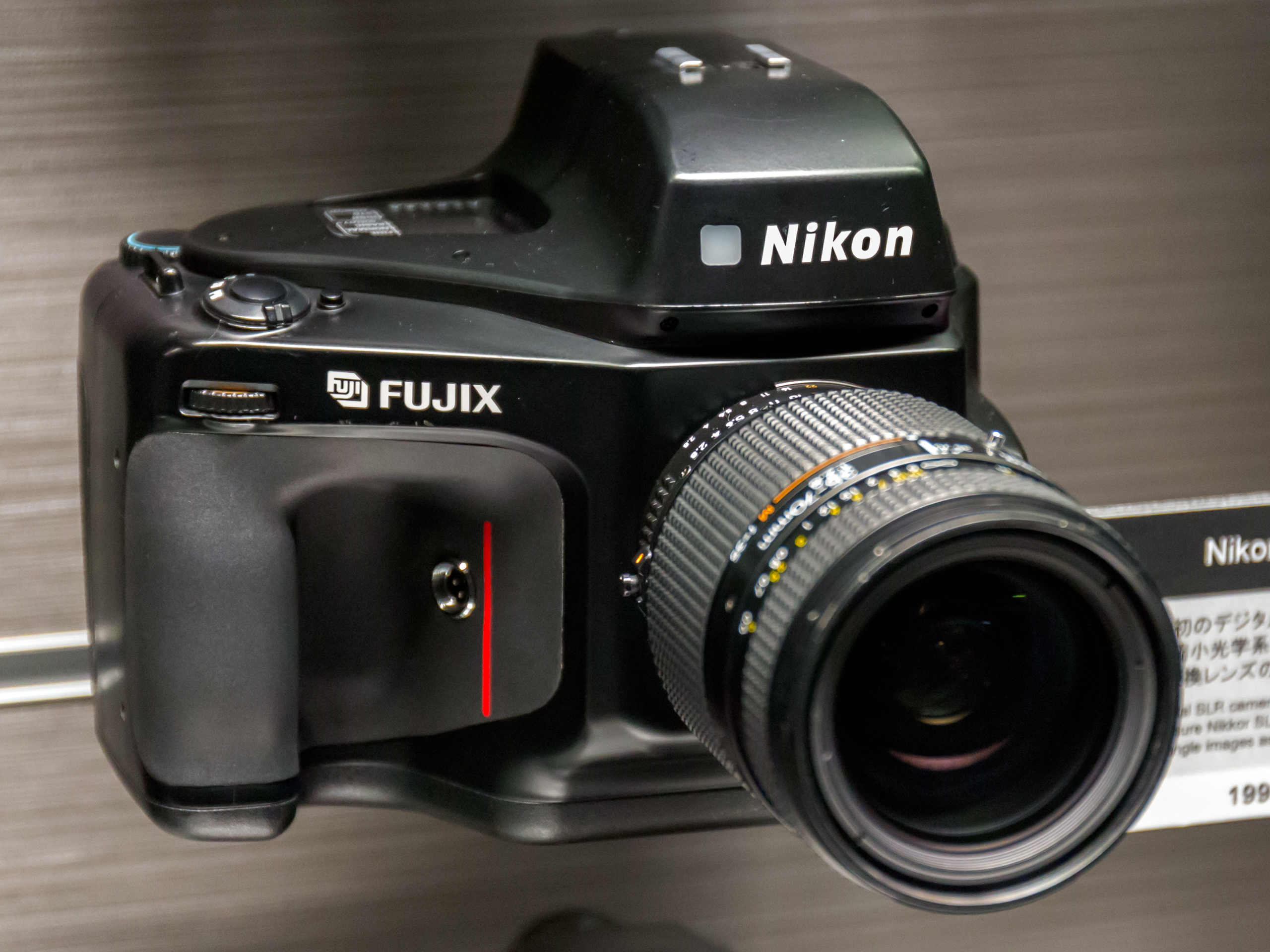
Nikon E2/FUJIX DS-505 (1995)

Telecompressors were used in early digital SLR systems like the Minolta RD-175 and the Nikon E series. The technology of the time used relatively small sensor sizes, so lenses designed for 35 mm film could not be used with their native field of view without additional optics used. Implementing a telecompressor helped to mitigate these limitations. One effect of a telecompressor is that it reduces the diameter of the image circle, which means that a lens meant for a larger format can be used on a smaller sensor, partially making up for the latter's crop factor.
