= Minolta RD-175 =

Early DSLR camera that used three CCD sensors

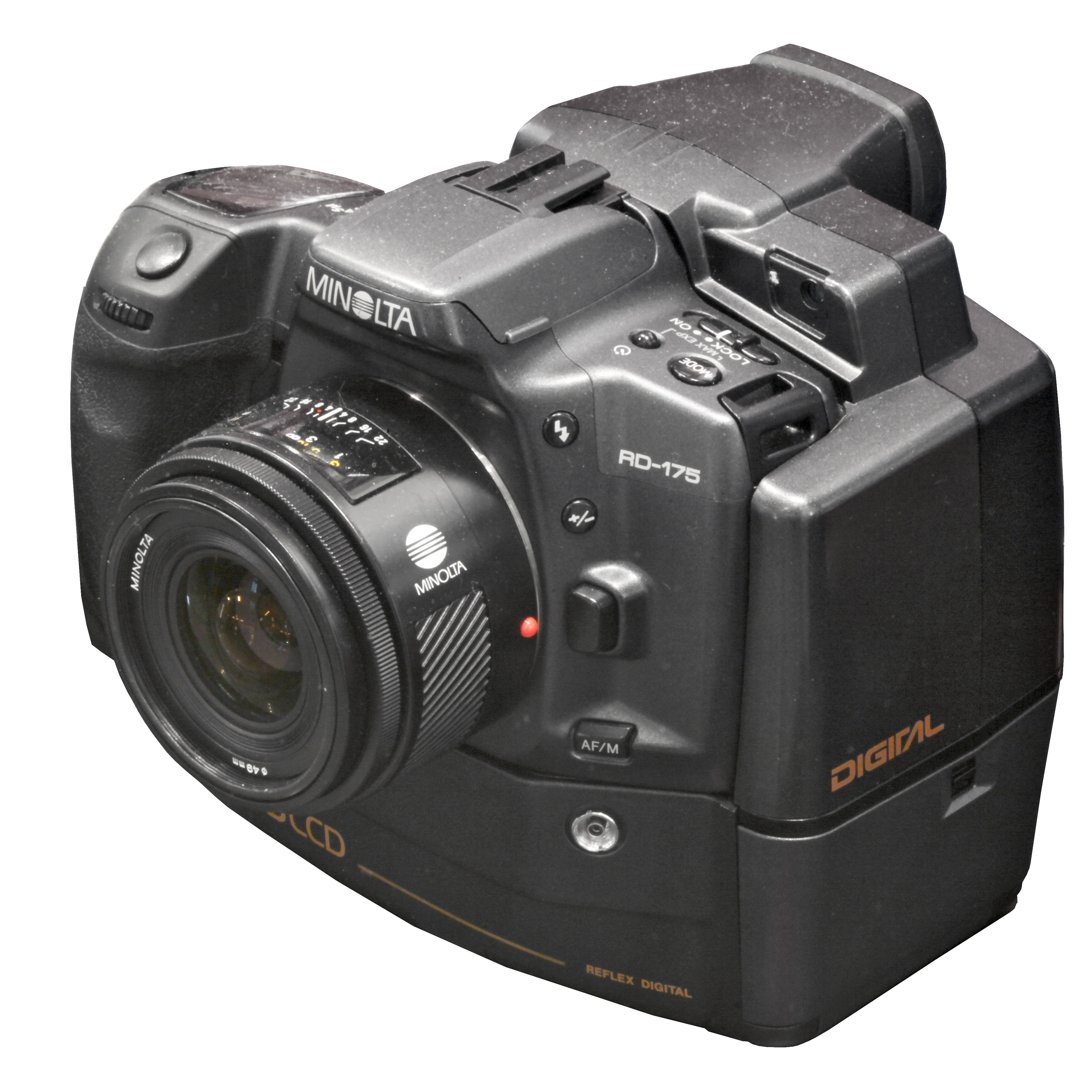
- Image of the Minolta RD-175

Overview
- Maker: Minolta
- Type: Digital SLR camera

Lens
- Lens mount: A-mount

Sensor/medium
- Sensor type: 3 × CCD
- Sensor size: 1/2"
- Recording medium: PC Card (Type I, II, or III)

Focusing
- Focus: Automatic

Exposure/metering
- Exposure modes: PASM

Flash
- Flash: built-in, GN 12
- Flash synchronization: 1/90 s

Shutter
- Shutter speeds: 1/2 – 1/2000 s

General
- Battery: 1 × 6 V (2CR5, body); 1 × 7.2 V (NP-500H, back); 1 × 3 V (CR2025, clock)
- Data port: SCSI
- Dimensions: 161 mm × 128 mm × 145 mm (6.3 in × 5.0 in × 5.7 in) W × D × H
- Weight: 1.1 kg (2.4 lb)

The Minolta RD-175 is an early digital SLR, introduced in 1995. Minolta combined an existing SLR with a three way splitter and three separate CCD image sensors, giving 0.41 megapixels (MP) of resolution. The base of the DSLR was the Minolta Maxxum 500si Super, marketed as the Dynax 500si Super in Europe and as Alpha 303si Super in Asia. Agfa produced a version of the RD-175, which retailed as the Agfa ActionCam.

The RD-175 was also notable as the first consumer digital camera to be used in a professional stop motion production, being used to create the full-motion claymation adventure video game The Neverhood.

== Technology ==
Photograph taken with an RD-175, 1999

The camera uses Minolta A-mount lenses with a crop factor of 2.

The light entering the central 12 mm × 16 mm area of the RD-175's focal plane was compressed by 0.56× relay optics behind the focal plane, similar to the optical reduction system used in the Nikon E series. The light bundled on the smaller sensor area increased the effective sensitivity (ISO) by 2 2/3 stops.

Since state of the art single-CCD resolution at the time was insufficient for Minolta, the light was split and sent to three separate 4.8 × 6.4 mm sized 768 × 494 pixel (3 × 0.3 MP) image sensors, two used for green and one for the red and blue color, reducing the sensitivity increase to about 2 stops. The only usable ISO speed was 800.

Images were stored on an internal 128 MB PCMCIA hard drive. The output of the three sensors were combined digitally when imported to a computer and interpolated to the final size of 1.8 MP (1528 × 1146 pixels). On its original release, the bundled software was compatible only with Macintosh OS. Depending on the computer, importing and processing a single image could take from 50 to 108 seconds.

== See also ==
- Telecompressor

Level	Sensor	2004	2005	2006	2007	2008	2009	2010	2011		2012	2013	2014	2015	2016	2017	2018	2019	2020
Professional	Full frame						α900					α99				α99 II			
Professional	Full frame							α850											
High-end	APS-C		DG-7D			α700				α77				α77 II					
Midrange	APS-C									α65					α68				
Upper-entry	APS-C								α55		α57								
Upper-entry	APS-C				α100			α550 ^{F}	α580				α58						
Upper-entry	APS-C		DG-5D					α500	α560										
Upper-entry	APS-C							α450											
Entry-level	APS-C								α33	α35	α37								
Entry-level	APS-C					α350 ^{F}		α380	α390										
Entry-level	APS-C					α300		α330											
Entry-level	APS-C					α200		α230	α290										
Early models	Minolta 7000 with SB-70/SB-70S (1986) · Minolta 9000 with SB-90/SB-90S (1986) (Still video SLRs); Minolta MS-C1100 (1992) · Minolta RD-175 (1995)																		
Level	Sensor																		
Level	Sensor	2004	2005	2006	2007	2008	2009	2010	2011		2012	2013	2014	2015	2016	2017	2018	2019	2020
