= Sony FE 70-200mm F2.8 GM OSS =

- Maker: Sony
- Lens mount: Sony E-mount

Technical data
- Type: Zoom
- Focus drive: Ring Drive Super Sonic wave motor; Double linear motor
- Focal length: 70-200mm
- Image format: 35mm full-frame
- Aperture (max/min): f/2.8 - 22.0
- Close focus distance: 0.96 metres (3.1 ft)
- Max. magnification: 1:4 (0.25x)
- Diaphragm blades: 11
- Construction: 23 elements in 18 groups

Features
- Manual focus override: Yes Yes
- Weather-sealing: Yes Yes
- Lens-based stabilization: Yes Yes
- Aperture ring: No No
- Unique features: GM-series lens
- Application: Landscape, Portrait, Sports, Low light

Physical
- Max. length: 200 millimetres (7.9 in)
- Diameter: 88 millimetres (3.5 in)
- Weight: 1,480.1 grams (3.263 lb)
- Filter diameter: 77mm

Accessories
- Lens hood: ALC-SH145

Angle of view
- Horizontal: 34° - 12° 30'

History
- Introduction: 2016

Retail info
- MSRP: $2599 USD

The Sony FE 70-200mm F2.8 GM OSS is a premium, constant maximum aperture full-frame (FE) telephoto zoom lens for the Sony E-mount, announced by Sony on February 3, 2016.

The 70-200mm f/2.8 lens is popular among event photographers and photojournalists where the lower light capabilities are required. Some portrait photographers also prefer this lens for the improved background blur produced by the f/2.8 aperture.

Though designed for Sony's full frame E-mount cameras, the lens can be used on Sony's APS-C E-mount camera bodies, with an equivalent full-frame field-of-view of 105-300mm.

== Build quality ==
The lens showcases an off-white weather resistant plastic and metal exterior with a rubber focus and zoom ring. The lens features external controls for enabling image stabilization, limiting the focal range of the lens, and changing focusing modes. It also features three external focus-hold buttons for locking in focus on a subject in motion. The lens maintains its physical length throughout its zoom range.

The Sony FE 70-200mm F2.8 GM OSS lens is one of Sony's few telephoto lenses that are compatible with their own dedicated 1.4x and 2.0x lens teleconvertors. When equipped, the combination yields an effective focal length of 98-280mm (f/4.0) and 140-400mm (f/5.6), respectively.

== Image quality ==
The lens is exceptionally sharp throughout its zoom range at its maximum aperture of f/2.8. Distortion, vignetting, and chromatic aberration are all well controlled.

When using the 1.4x and 2.0x teleconverters, image quality falls off overall but remains fairly sharp.

== See also ==
- List of Sony E-mount lenses
- Sony FE 70-200mm F4 G OSS
- Sony FE 100-400mm F4.5-5.6 GM OSS
