= Sony FE 70-300mm F4.5-5.6 G OSS =

- Maker: Sony
- Lens mount(s): Sony E-mount

Technical data
- Type: Zoom
- Focus drive: Stepper motor
- Focal length: 70-300mm
- Image format: 35mm full-frame
- Aperture (max/min): f/4.5 - 22.0
- Close focus distance: 0.9 metres (3.0 ft)
- Max. magnification: 1:3 (0.31x)
- Diaphragm blades: 9

Features
- Manual focus override: Yes Yes
- Weather-sealing: Yes Yes
- Lens-based stabilization: Yes Yes
- Aperture ring: No No
- Unique features: G-series lens
- Application: Landscape, Wildlife

Physical
- Max. length: 143.5 millimetres (5.65 in)
- Diameter: 84 millimetres (3.3 in)
- Weight: 854 grams (1.883 lb)
- Filter diameter: 72mm

History
- Introduction: 2016

Retail info
- MSRP: $1199 USD

The Sony FE 70-300mm F4.5-5.6 G OSS is a variable maximum aperture full-frame telephoto zoom lens for the Sony E-mount, announced by Sony in 2016. Though designed for Sony's full frame E-mount cameras, the lens can be used on Sony's APS-C E-mount camera bodies.

The 70-300mm F4.5-5.6 G lens is one of the least expensive G-series lens Sony makes, is popular among weight-sensitive landscape photographers, wildlife photographers, and hobbyists who want G-lens quality and the extra reach this lens has over its 70-200mm counterparts.

Given its unusually high 1:3 (0.31x) image reproduction ratio, the 70-300mm lens can be considered a pseudo-macro lens. Though designed for Sony's full frame E-mount cameras, the lens can be used on Sony's APS-C E-mount camera bodies, with an equivalent full-frame field-of-view of 105-450mm.

== Build quality ==
The lens features a weather resistant matte black plastic exterior with the G-brand label and a rubber focus and zoom ring. The barrel of the lens telescopes outward from the main lens body as it's zoomed in from 70mm to 300mm.

On the side of the lens lies a set of four external controls for enabling image stabilization, limiting the focal range of the lens, and changing focusing modes. It also features an external focus hold button for locking in focus on a subject in motion.

== Image quality ==
The lens is fairly sharp throughout its zoom range, with only a mild fall-off in acuity toward the edges of the frame at 300mm. Distortion, vignetting, and chromatic aberration are all well controlled.

== See also ==
- List of Sony E-mount lenses
- Sony FE 70-200mm F4 G OSS
- Sony FE 100-400mm F4.5-5.6 GM OSS
