= V-mount =

V-mount may refer to:

- Hasselblad V-mount, a bayonet lens mount used in a series of Hasselblad medium format cameras
- Minolta V-mount, a fully electronic bayonet lens mount used in the Minolta Vectis and RD series of APS-C cameras and lenses
- V-mount batteries, or v lock batteries, are used to power cameras, portable lighting, monitors, microphones and other similar equipment.
