= Lens adapter =

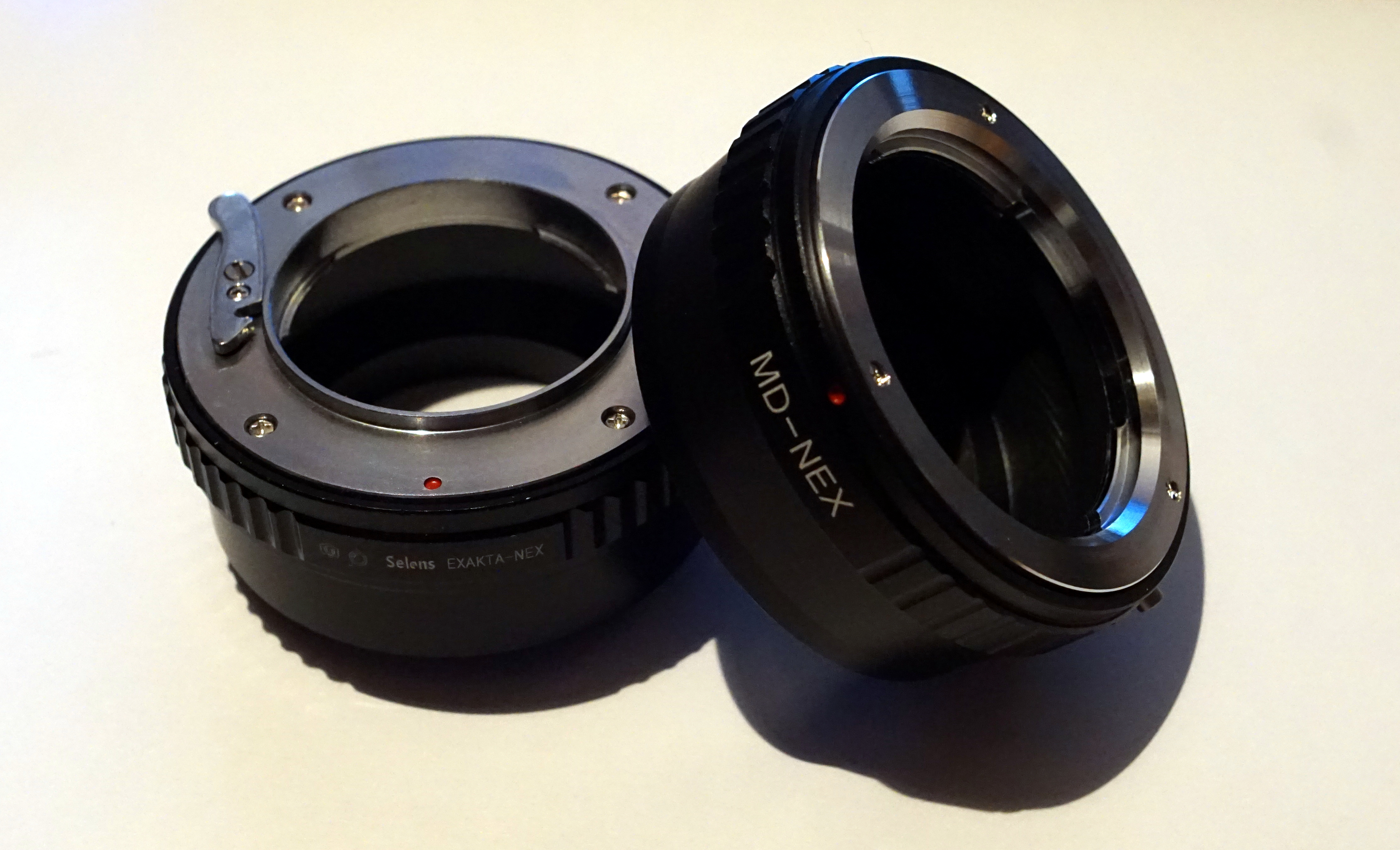
Two passive adapters to mount lenses to Sony E-mount cameras – for Exakta (left) and for Minolta SR/MD lenses (right).

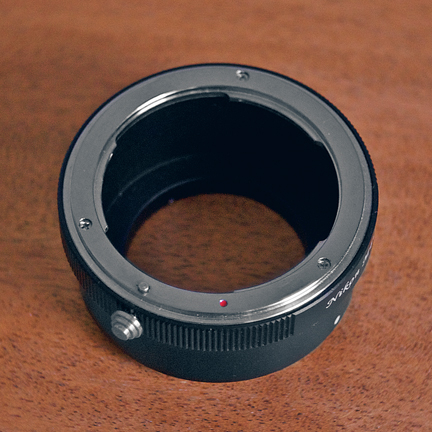
This lens adapter is a passive adapter designed for mounting a Nikon F-mount lens to a Micro Four Thirds camera.

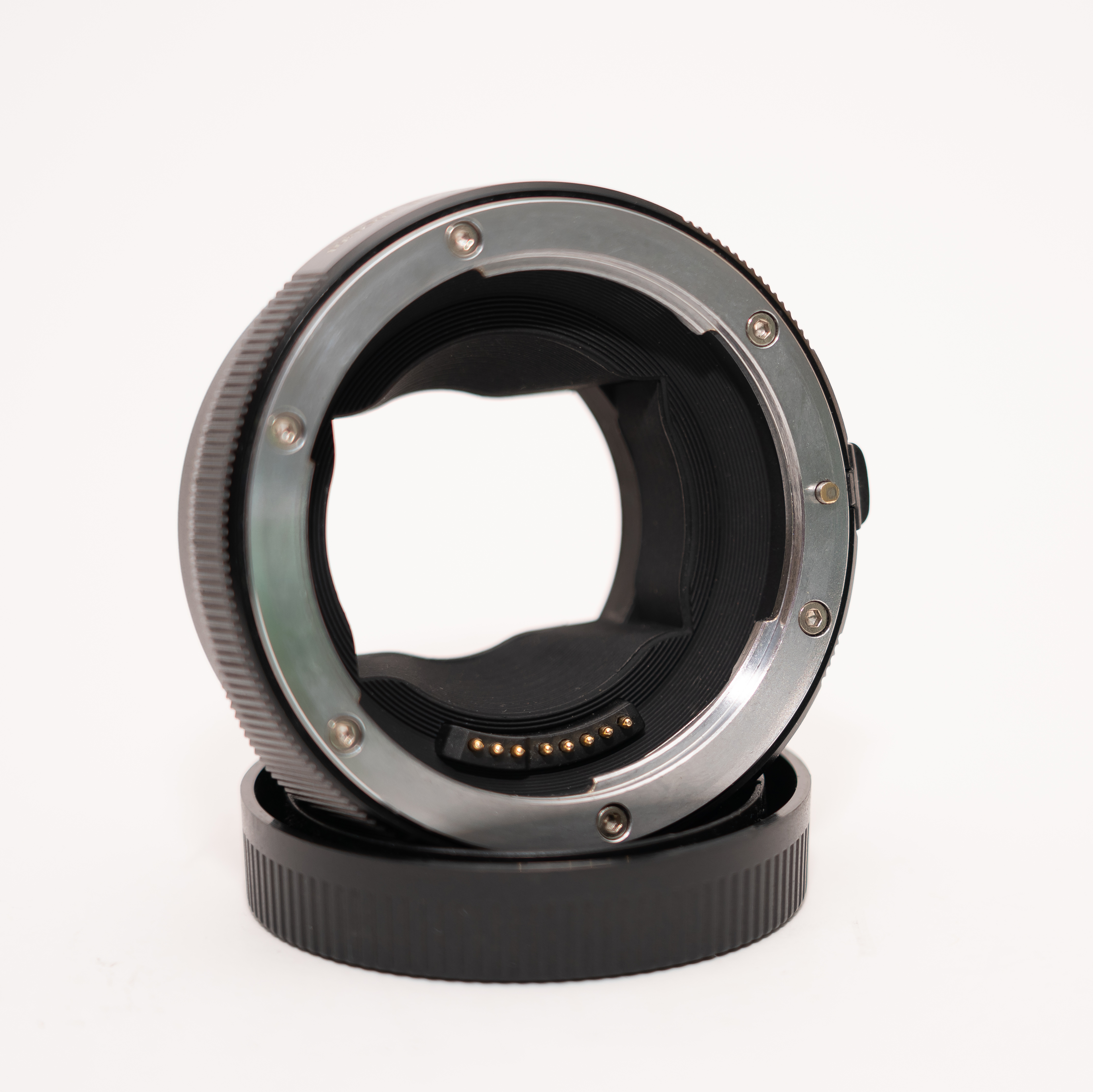
Active lens adapter: Canon EF to Sony E.

In photography and videography, a lens adapter is a device that enables the use of camera and lens combinations from otherwise incompatible systems. The most simple lens adapter designs, passive lens adapters provide a secure physical connection between the camera and the lens. Some passive adapters may include a mechanism for manual iris control. So called "active lens adapters" will include electronic connections, enabling communication between the lens and the camera.

Some lens adapters include a special optical element called a telecompressor, focal reducer, or more recently a "speed booster", a genericised trademark that refers to the Metabones Speed Booster line of lens adapters. This type of adapter is designed to reduce focal length, increase lens speed, and in some instances improve MTF performance. Another innovator in the field is KIPON, a German/Chinese co-operation between Kipon and IB/E Optics. Another branch of lens adapters include an ND-filter to simplify changing lenses, which HolyManta introduced in 2013.

The depth-of-field adapter (also called a DOF adapter or 35 mm adapter) is a largely obsolete device that uses a ground glass focusing screen to enable the use of interchangeable lenses on a fixed lens camcorder. There are also lens adapters made for other optical systems, including microscopes and telescopes.

== Basic design ==
Most lens adapters feature a male fitting and a female fitting. The male fitting attaches to the camera in the same way as that manufacturer's OEM lens, with the female fitting attaches to the lens. There is also an opening in the center to allow the light to pass through. Lens adapters can be shorter or longer, based on the respective flange focal distance of the lens and camera being adapted. Flange focal distance is the key specification in determining whether or not a particular type of lens can be adapted to any given camera. Generally speaking, cameras with a shorter flange focal distance can be adapted to a greater diversity of lenses. This is because there must be enough room to fit an adapter between the lens and the camera.

It is possible to physically mount a lens with a short flange focal distance on a camera with a long flange focal distance, but this will make it impossible to achieve infinity focus. The effect will be similar to that of an extension tube, because the lens will be mounted further from the image plane than intended. Some lens adapters utilize an optical element to compensate for this, effectively acting as a teleconverter. This introduces the typical side effects of a teleconverter, namely decreasing the amount of light that reaches the sensor, and adding a crop factor to the lens.

Additionally, there are several secondary factors to consider. Lenses designed for a smaller image sensor may not be adaptable to camera bodies with larger sensors as the image circle may not be large enough to cover the entire sensor, and will therefore exhibit vignetting. The age of the camera body may limit the availability of adapters; as camera bodies typically reach obsolescence before lenses. Finally, some adapters may include electronic or mechanical provisions in order to control the lens aperture and autofocus, to record the correct Exif data, or to report focus confirmation.

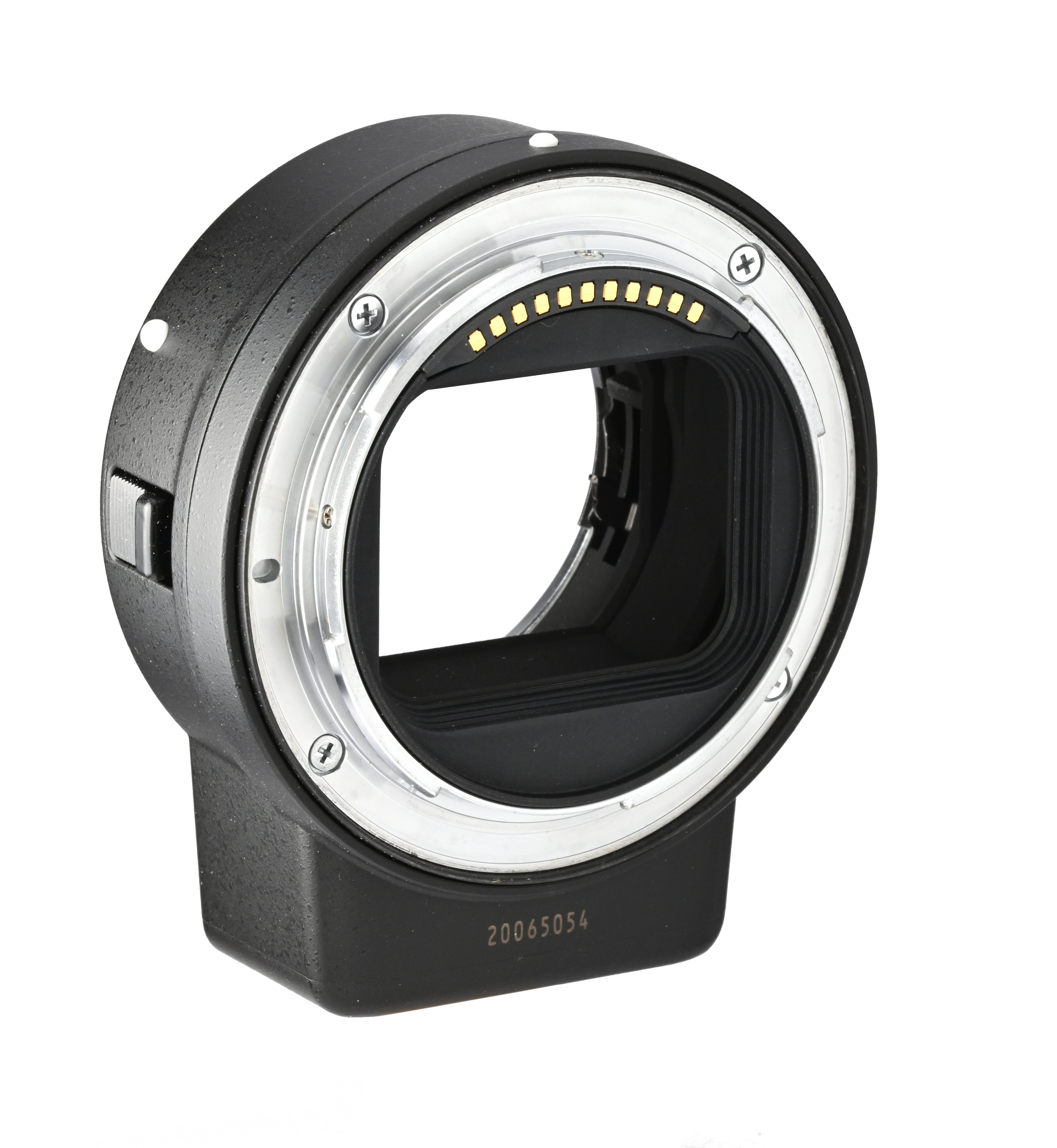
Nikon FTZ Mount Adapter (first gen), for mounting a Nikon F-mount lens to a Nikon Z-mount camera.

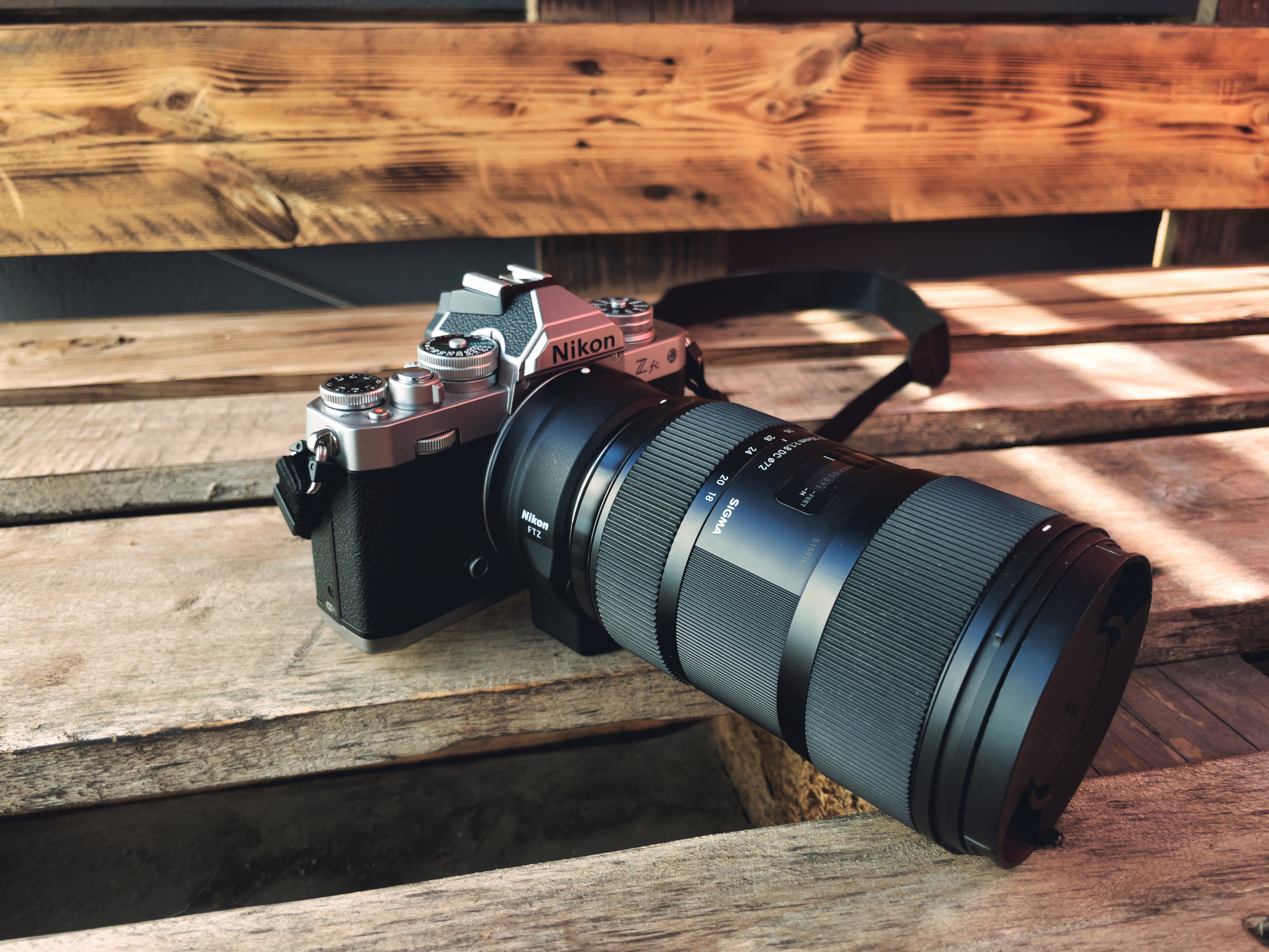
Sigma 18-35mm f/1.8 DC HSM Art F-mount lens mounted on a Z-mount Nikon Zfc, using the Nikon FTZ adapter.

== Table of adapters for camera bodies ==
The following table shows commonly available adapters that don't require an optical element. Hover the cursor over a cell to see examples for mount adapter product names for that mount and camera combination.

Lens Camera			Lens Mount (by flange distance in mm)															
Lens Camera			16	17.7	18	19.25	25.5	26.7	27.8	28.8	29	42	44	44.5	45.46	45.5	46.5	47
Lens Camera			Z	X	E	MFT	NX	G	LM	M39	CG	FD	EF	A	PK	M42	F	LR
Camera Body Mount	16	Z	★	Yes	Yes	Yes†	Yes‡	Yes	Yes	Yes	Yes	Yes	Yes	Yes	Yes	Yes	Yes	Yes
Camera Body Mount	17.7	X	No	★	No*	Yes†	No	Yes‡	Yes	Yes	Yes	Yes	Yes	Yes	Yes	Yes	Yes	Yes
Camera Body Mount	18	E	No	No	★	Yes†	Yes‡	Yes‡	Yes	Yes	Yes	Yes	Yes	Yes	Yes	Yes	Yes	Yes
Camera Body Mount	19.25	MFT	No	No	No	★	Yes‡	No*	Yes	Yes	Yes	Yes	Yes	Yes	Yes	Yes	Yes	Yes
Camera Body Mount	25.5	NX	No	No	No	No	★	No*	Yes‡	Yes	No	Yes	Yes	Yes‡	Yes‡	Yes	Yes	Yes‡
Camera Body Mount	26.7	G	No	No	No	No	No	★	No*	No*	No*	Yes†	Yes†	Yes†	Yes†	Yes†	Yes†	Yes†
Camera Body Mount	27.8	LM	No	No	No	No	No	No	★	Yes	No	Yes	Yes	Yes‡	Yes	Yes	Yes	Yes
Camera Body Mount	29	CG	No	No	No	No	No	No	No	No	★	No	No	No	No	No	No	No
Camera Body Mount	42	FD	No	No	No	No	No	No	No	No	No	★	No*	No	Yes	Yes	Yes	No
Camera Body Mount	44	EF	No	No	No	No	No	No	No	No	No	No	★	No∗	Yes	Yes	Yes	Yes
Camera Body Mount	44.5	A	No	No	No	No	No	No	No	No	No	No	No	★	No∗	Yes	No∗	Yes
Camera Body Mount	45.46	PK	No	No	No	No	No	No	No	No	No	No	No	No	★	Yes	No∗	Yes
Camera Body Mount	46.5	F	No	No	No	No	No	No	No	No	No	No	No	No	No	Yes	★	Yes
Camera Body Mount	47	LR	No	No	No	No	No	No	No	No	No	No	No	No	No	No	No	★

Legend:

★ Native lens-camera combination - an adapter is not required

† Image may exhibit vignetting due to sensor size.

‡ Theoretically possible, but may be difficult to find.

∗ Although the camera's flange distance is shorter than the lens', there is not enough distance between the flange and the lens to integrate the bayonet.

== See also ==
- Lens mount
- MC-11 (mount adapter) – Sigma MC-11 SA-E mount adapter for Sigma SA-mount lenses to Sony E-mount cameras; and Sigma MC-11 EF-E mount adapter for Canon EF-mount lenses to Sony E-mount cameras
