= Full-frame camera =

Digital camera with a 36×24mm sensor

The sizes of sensors used in most current digital cameras, relative to a 35 mm format

A full-frame camera is a digital single-lens reflex camera (DSLR) or mirrorless camera with an image sensor format of 36 mm × 24 mm. This format is equivalent to the 35 mm film format, which was historically one of the standard film formats. Because of this equivalence, 36 mm × 24 mm is occasionally called 35mm full-frame format.

Many digital cameras, both compact and SLR models, use smaller sensor formats as they are generally easier and cheaper to manufacture.

Historically, the earliest digital SLR models, such as the Nikon NASA F4 or Kodak DCS 100, also used a smaller sensor. Kodak states that 35 mm film (note: in "Academy format", 21.0 mm × 15.2 mm) has the equivalent of 6K horizontal resolution, according to a senior vice president of IMAX. This equates to 10K horizontal resolution in full-frame size.

== History ==
The Nikon E2/E2s (1994), E2N/E2NS (1996) and E3/E3S (1998) digital SLRs as well as the similar Fujifilm Fujix DS-505/DS-515, DS-505A/DS-515A and DS-560/DS-565 models used a reduction optical system (ROS) to compress a full-frame 35 mm field onto a smaller 2/3-inch (11 mm diagonal) CCD imager. They were therefore not digital SLRs with full-frame sensors, however had an angle of view equivalent to full-frame digital SLRs for a given lens; they had no crop factor with respect to angle of view.

The first full-frame DSLR cameras were developed in Japan from around 2000 to 2002: the MZ-D by Pentax, the N Digital by Contax's Japanese R6D team, and the EOS-1Ds by Canon.

== Use of 35 mm film-camera lenses ==
If the lens mounts are compatible, many lenses, including manual-focus models, designed for earlier 35 mm cameras can be mounted on digital cameras. When a lens designed for a full-frame camera, whether film or digital, is mounted on a DSLR or mirrorless camera with a smaller sensor size, only the center of the lens's image circle is captured. The edges are cropped off, which is equivalent to zooming in on the center section of the imaging area. The ratio of the size of the full-frame 35 mm format to the size of the smaller format is known as the crop factor or focal-length multiplier, and is typically in the range of 1.3 (APS-H sensors) to 2 (Four Thirds and Micro Four Thirds systems) for digital cameras with sensors smaller than full-frame.

== Advantages and disadvantages compared to other formats ==
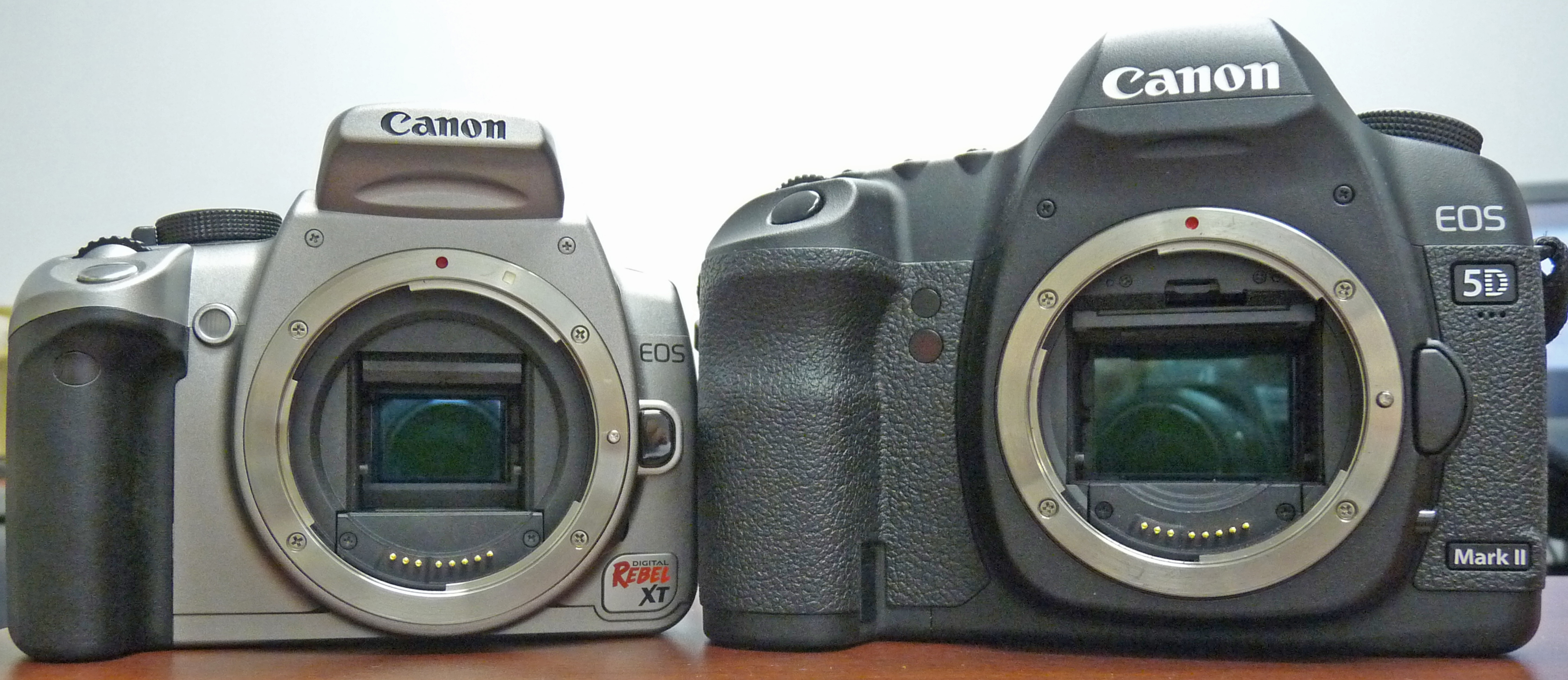
An APS-C format DSLR (left) and a full-frame DSLR (right) show the difference in the size of the sensors. Both DSLRs use the same-sized Canon EF lens mount.

When used with lenses designed for full frame film or digital cameras, full-frame DSLRs offer a number of advantages compared to their smaller-sensor counterparts. One advantage is that wide-angle lenses designed for full-frame 35 mm retain that same wide angle of view. On smaller-sensor DSLRs, wide-angle lenses have smaller angles of view equivalent to those of longer-focal-length lenses on 35 mm film cameras. For example, a 24 mm lens on a camera with a crop factor of 1.5 has a 62° diagonal angle of view, the same as that of a 36 mm lens on a 35 mm film camera. On a full-frame digital camera, the 24 mm lens has the same 84° angle of view as it would on a 35 mm film camera.

If the same lens is used on both full-frame and cropped formats, and the subject distance is adjusted to have the same field of view (i.e., the same framing of the subject) in each format, depth of field (DoF) is in inverse proportion to the format sizes, so for the same f-number, the full-frame format will have less DoF. Equivalently, for the same DoF, the full-frame format will require a larger f-number (that is, a smaller aperture diameter). This relationship is approximate and holds for moderate subject distances, breaking down as the distance with the smaller format approaches the hyperfocal distance, and as the magnification with the larger format approaches the macro range.

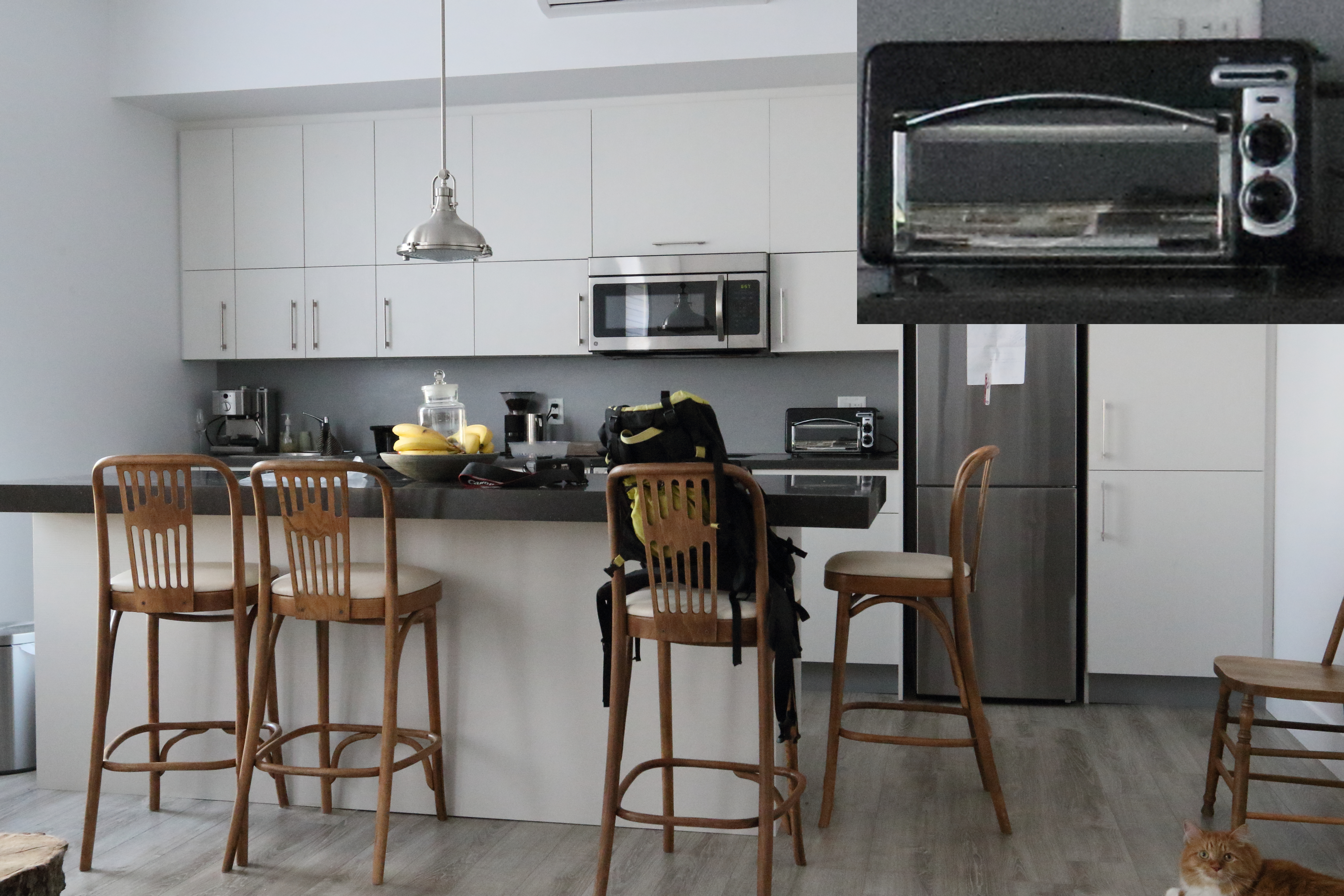
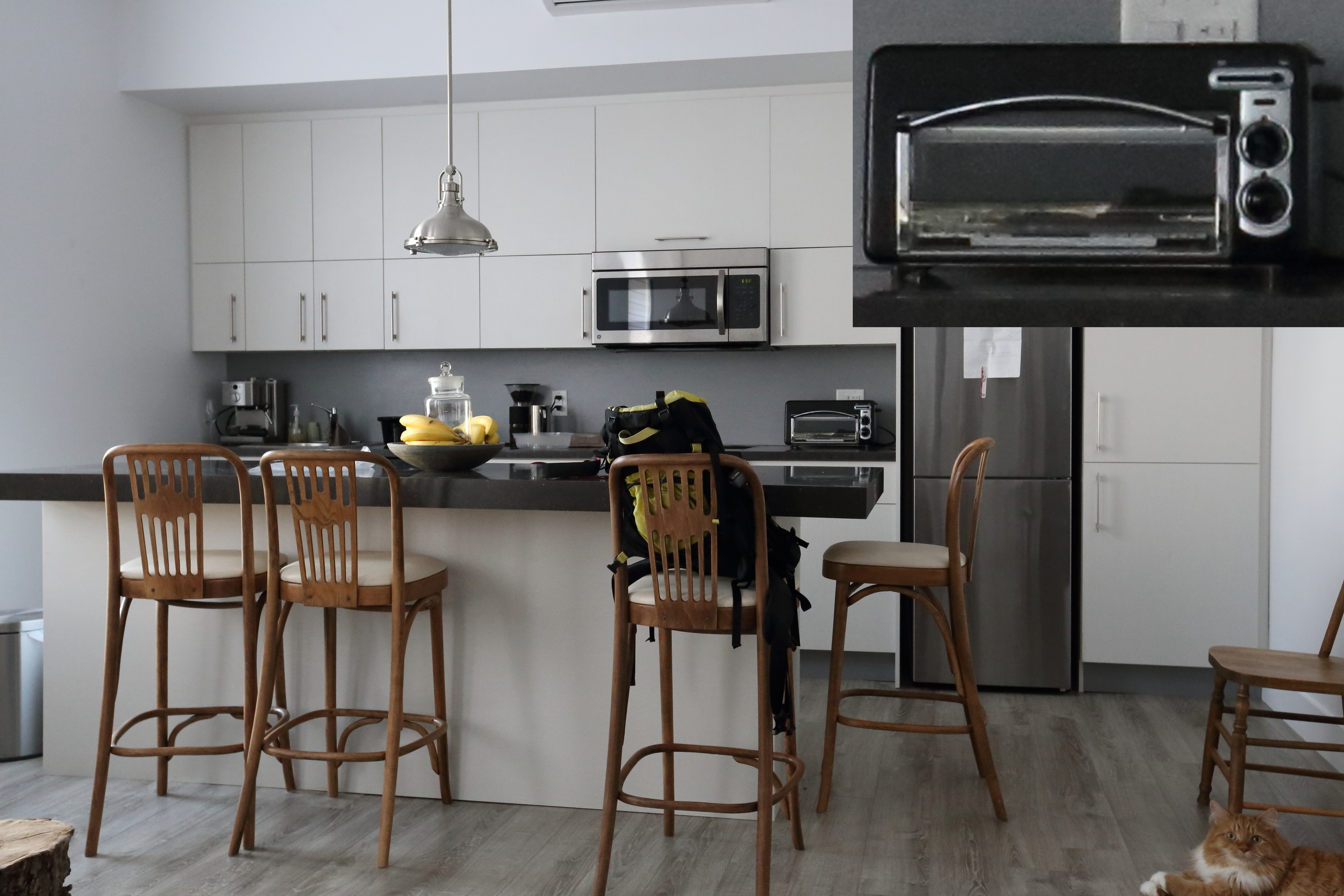
Two photographs with the same lens and ISO (6400), aperture (f/8), but a different sensor size: upon zooming in (insets), one notices there is less noise in the bottom picture (full-frame sensor - Canon EOS 6D) than in the top one (smaller sensor - EOS 7D Mark II). Shutter speeds were 1/40s and 1/50s, respectively, which means that a 20% increase in lighting conditions for the latter photograph (for example, with an additional light source in the room) would have been needed to make all conditions equal. But that difference in noise would still be observed.

There are optical quality implications as well—not only because the image from the lens is effectively cropped—but because many lens designs are now optimized for sensors smaller than 36 mm × 24 mm. The rear element of any SLR lens must have clearance for the camera's reflex mirror to move up when the shutter is released; with a wide-angle lens, this requires a retrofocus design, which is generally of inferior optical quality. Because a cropped-format sensor can have a smaller mirror, less clearance is needed, and some lenses, such as the EF-S lenses for the Canon APS-C sized bodies, are designed with a shorter back-focus distance; however, they cannot be used on bodies with larger sensors.

The full-frame sensor can also be useful with wide-angle perspective control or tilt/shift lenses; in particular, the wider angle of view is often more suitable for architectural photography.

While full-frame DSLRs offer advantages for wide-angle photography, smaller-sensor DSLRs offer some advantages for telephoto photography because the smaller angle of view of small-sensor DSLRs enhances the telephoto effect of the lenses. For example, a 200 mm lens on a camera with a crop factor of 1.5× has the same angle of view as a 300 mm lens on a full-frame camera. The extra "reach", for a given number of pixels, can be helpful in specific areas of photography such as wildlife or sports.

Lower size sensors also allow for the use of a wider range of lenses, since some types of optical impurities (specifically vignetting) are most visible around the edge of the lens. By only using the center of the lens, these impurities are not noticed. In practice, this allows for the use of lower cost lenses without corresponding loss of quality.

Finally, full frame sensors allow for sensor designs that result in lower noise levels at high ISO and a greater dynamic range in captured images. Pixel density is lower on full frame sensors. This means the pixels can be either spaced further apart from each other, or each photodiode can be manufactured at a slightly larger size. Larger pixel sizes can capture more light which has the advantage of allowing more light to be captured before over saturation of the photodiode. Additionally, less noise is generated by adjacent pixels and their emf fields with larger photodiodes or greater spacing between photodiodes. For a given number of pixels, the larger sensor allows for larger pixels or photosites that provide wider dynamic range and lower noise at high ISO levels. As a consequence, full-frame DSLRs may produce better quality images in certain high contrast or low light situations.

Production costs for a full-frame sensor can exceed twenty times the costs for an APS-C sensor. Only 20 full-frame sensors will fit on an 8-inch (200 mm) silicon wafer, and yield is comparatively low because the sensor's large area makes it very vulnerable to contaminants—20 evenly distributed defects could theoretically ruin an entire wafer. Additionally, when full-frame sensors were first produced, they required three separate exposures during the photolithography stage, tripling the number of masks and exposure processes. Modern photolithography equipment now allows single-pass exposures for full-frame sensors, but other size-related production constraints remain much the same.

Some full-frame DSLRs intended mainly for professional use include more features than typical consumer-grade DSLRs, so some of their larger dimensions and increased mass result from more rugged construction and additional features as opposed to this being an inherent consequence of the full-frame sensor.

Family	Level	Format	'10	2011		2012	2013	2014	2015	2016	2017	2018	2019	2020	2021	2022	2023	2024	2025	2026
Alpha (α)	Indust	FF																ILX-LR1 ^{●}		
Alpha (α)	Cine line	FF													_{m} FX6 ^{●}					
Alpha (α)	Cine line	FF																		_{m} FX5 ^{AT●}
Alpha (α)	Cine line	FF													_{m} FX3 ^{AT●}					
Alpha (α)	Cine line	FF																		_{m} FX2 ^{AT●}
Alpha (α)	Flag	FF													_{m} α1 ^{FT●}				_{m} α1 II ^{FAT●}	
Alpha (α)	Speed	FF										_{m} α9 ^{FT●}			_{m} α9 II ^{FT●}				_{m} α9 III ^{FAT●}	
Alpha (α)	Sens	FF							_{m} α7S ^{●}	_{m} α7S II ^{F●}					_{m} α7S III ^{AT●}					
Alpha (α)	Hi-Res	FF						_{m} α7R ^{●}		_{m} α7R II ^{F●}		_{m} α7R III ^{FT●}		_{m} α7R IV ^{FT●}			_{m} α7R V ^{FAT●}			_{m} α7R VI ^{FAT●}
Alpha (α)	Basic	FF						_{m} α7 ^{F●}	_{m} α7 II ^{F●}				_{m} α7 III ^{FT●}			_{m} α7 IV ^{AT●}				_{m} α7 V ^{FAT●}
Alpha (α)	Compact	FF																_{m} α7CR ^{AT●}		
Alpha (α)	Compact	FF													_{m} α7C ^{AT●}			_{m} α7C II ^{AT●}		
Alpha (α)	Vlog	FF																_{m} ZV-E1 ^{AT●}		
Alpha (α)	Cine	APS-C															_{m} FX30 ^{AT●}			
Alpha (α)	Adv	APS-C			_{s} NEX-7 ^{F●}						_{m} α6500 ^{FT●}			_{m} α6600 ^{FT●}				_{m} α6700 ^{AT●}		
Alpha (α)	Mid-range	APS-C				_{m} NEX-6 ^{F●}					_{m} α6300 ^{F●}		_{m} α6400 ^{F+T●}							
Alpha (α)	Mid-range	APS-C						_{m} α6000 ^{F●}						_{m} α6100 ^{FT●}						
Alpha (α)	Vlog	APS-C														_{m} ZV-E10 ^{AT●}			_{m} ZV-E10 II ^{AT●}	
Alpha (α)	Entry-level	APS-C	NEX-5 ^{F●}	NEX-5N ^{FT●}		NEX-5R ^{F+T●}	NEX-5T ^{F+T●}		α5100 ^{F+T●}											
Alpha (α)	Entry-level	APS-C	NEX-3 ^{F●}	NEX-C3 ^{F●}		NEX-F3 ^{F+●}	NEX-3N ^{F+●}	α5000 ^{F+●}												
DSLR-style		APS-C					_{m} α3000 ^{●}		_{m} α3500 ^{●}											
SmartShot		APS-C							QX1 ^{M●}											
CineAlta	Cine line	FF										VENICE				VENICE 2				
CineAlta	Cine line	FF																BURANO		
XDCAM	Cine line	FF												_{m} FX9						
XDCAM	Docu	S35							_{m} FS7		_{m} FS7 II									
XDCAM	Mobile	S35								_{m} FS5			_{m} FS5 II							
NXCAM	Pro	S35		NEX-FS100		NEX-FS700	NEX-FS700R													
NXCAM	APS-C					NEX-EA50														
Handycam	FF					_{m} NEX-VG900														
Handycam	APS-C		_{s} NEX-VG10		_{s} NEX-VG20	_{m} NEX-VG30														
Security		FF									SNC-VB770									
Security		FF									UMC-S3C									
Family	Level	Format																		
Family	Level	Format	'10	2011		2012	2013	2014	2015	2016	2017	2018	2019	2020	2021	2022	2023	2024	2025	2026

Sensor	Class	12	13	14	15	16	17	18	19	20	21	22	23	24	25	26
Full-frame	Flagship														_{m} R1 ^{ATS}	
Full-frame	Professional											_{m} R3 ^{ATS}				
Full-frame	Professional										R5 ^{ATSR}				_{m} R5 Mk II ^{ATSR}	
Full-frame	Professional											_{m} R5 C ^{ATCR}				
Full-frame	Advanced										R6 ^{ATS}		_{m} R6 Mk II ^{ATS}			_{m} R6 Mk III ^{ATS}
Full-frame	Advanced															R6 V ^{ATS}
Full-frame	Advanced									Ra ^{AT}						
Full-frame	Advanced								R ^{AT}							
Full-frame	Midrange													_{m} R8 ^{AT}		_{m} R8 Mk II ^{ATS}
Full-frame	Entry/mid								RP ^{AT}							
APS-C	Advanced												_{m} R7 ^{ATS}			
APS-C	Midrange						M5 ^{FT}						_{m} R10 ^{AT}			
APS-C	Entry/mid		_{x} M ^{T}	M2 ^{T}	M3 ^{FT}			M6 ^{FT}		M6 Mk II ^{FT}						
APS-C	Entry/mid								M50 ^{AT}		M50 Mk II ^{AT}			_{m} R50 ^{AT}		
APS-C	Entry/mid															_{m} R50 V ^{AT}
APS-C	Entry					M10 ^{FT}		M100 ^{FT}		M200 ^{FT}				R100		
Sensor	Class															
Sensor	Class	12	13	14	15	16	17	18	19	20	21	22	23	24	25	26

Sensor	Class	2018	2019	2020	2021	2022	2023	2024	2025	2026
FX (Full-frame)	Flagship					^{8K} Z9 ^{S}				
FX (Full-frame)	Flagship							^{8K} Z8 ^{S}		
FX (Full-frame)	Professional		^{4K} Z7 ^{S}		^{4K} Z7Ⅱ ^{S}					
FX (Full-frame)	Professional		^{4K} Z6 ^{S}		^{4K} Z6Ⅱ ^{S}				^{6K} Z6Ⅲ ^{S}	
FX (Full-frame)	Cinema									^{6K} ZR ^{S}
FX (Full-frame)	Enthusiast							^{4K} Zf ^{S}		
FX (Full-frame)	Enthusiast				^{4K} Z5 ^{S}					^{4K} Z5Ⅱ ^{S}
FX (Full-frame)	Entry-level									^{4K} Z5ⅡC ^{S}
DX (APS-C)	Enthusiast					^{4K} Zfc				
DX (APS-C)	Prosumer			^{4K} Z50					^{4K} Z50Ⅱ	
DX (APS-C)	Entry-level						^{4K} Z30			
Sensor	Class									
Sensor	Class	2018	2019	2020	2021	2022	2023	2024	2025	2026
