= Sony ILCE camera =

Sony E-mount camera models

In Sony digital cameras, the acronym ILCE stands for "Interchangeable Lens Camera with E-mount". In August 2013, Sony announced the first model of the ILCE mirrorless camera with E-mount, electronic viewfinder, contrast-detection autofocus and Multi Interface Shoe, the ILCE-3000. In October 2013, two full-frame E-mount cameras were announced, the ILCE-7 and ILCE-7R.

The "ILCE" designation replaces the "NEX" designation used for former E-mount cameras. As "ILCA", this naming convention will also be applied to future A-mount cameras, thereby replacing the former "DSLR" and "SLT" names.

== List of ILCE cameras ==
=== With APS-C sensor ===
- Sony NEX-3 also the NEX-5 NEX-7 NEX-6 are the first Sony ILCE 2010-2013
- Sony Alpha ILCE-3000 (α3000), with the price less than $350, the camera can only autofocus using contrast detection; it has no phase detection autofocus, no SteadyShot stabilization and no vibration dust reduction, all of which DSLRs commonly have, but has Bulb mode for night photography. It is a DSLR-like body, so it is bigger than the other ILCE cameras.
- Sony Alpha ILCE-3500 (α3500)
- Sony Alpha ILCE-5000 (α5000), with technical specs that differ little from the α3000, with 20.1MP and Full HD video recording ability. The significant changes relative to the α3000 are an upgrade of the imaging processor from Bionz to Bionz X, as well as the inclusion of near field communication and Wi-Fi, which leads Sony to bill the α5000 as the “world’s lightest interchangeable lens camera” (8 ounces) with Wi-Fi connectivity. The MSRP price is about $600. The camera is actually the successor to the Sony NEX-3N and has a NEX-like body.
- Sony Alpha ILCE-5100 (α5100). Released after α6000, this is an updated version of the α5000 with a 24.3MP sensor and on-chip phase detection, the same as the α6000 but in a compact body like the Sony NEX-3/5 line. Sony claims that it is the world's smallest interchangeable-lens camera with an APS-C-size-sensor and a built-in flash, but no electronic viewfinder.
- Sony Alpha ILCE-6000 (α6000). The successor to the NEX-6 and NEX-7 cameras. Has an electronic viewfinder and a Multi-Interface hot shoe.
- Sony Alpha ILCE-6300 (α6300) – Successor to the earlier NEX-6.
- Sony Alpha ILCE-6500 (α6500) – Successor to the α6300; first Sony APS-C body to feature 5-axis in-body stabilization.
- Sony Alpha ILCE-QX1 (QX1) – Lens-type "Smart Lens" camera designed for use with smartphones and Sony remote controllers, with a 20.1 megapixel APS-C-size Exmor CMOS sensor, BIONZ X image processor, interchangeable Sony E-mount lens, pop-up flash and RAW support.

=== With full-frame sensor ===
- Sony Alpha ILCE-7 (α7) - 24 MP sensor, 1/250 sync speed, hybrid AF, electronic first curtain available.
- Sony Alpha ILCE-7R (α7R) - 36 MP sensor, 1/160 sync speed.
- Sony Alpha ILCE-7S (α7S) - 12 MP sensor, 1/250 sync speed, electronic first curtain as well as full electronic shutter (completely silent) available, ISO 409600, 4K video (with external recorder).
- Sony Alpha ILCE-7M2 (α7 II) - 24 MP sensor, built-in 5-axis image stabilizer, 1/250 sync speed, hybrid AF, electronic first curtain available.
- Sony Alpha ILCE-7M3 (α7 III) - 24 MP back-illuminated sensor, built-in 5-axis image stabilizer, 1/250 sync speed, 693 phase-detect AF points, internal 4K video.
- Sony Alpha ILCE-7RM2 (α7R II) - 42 MP sensor, built-in 5-axis image stabilizer, 399 phase-detect AF points, internal 4K video, ISO 102400, silent shutter mode, dual card slots (1 UHS-II, 1 UHS-I/Memory Stick Duo), 10 fps continuous shooting.
- Sony Alpha ILCE-7RM3 (α7R III) - 42.4 MP back-illuminated sensor, built-in 5-axis image stabilizer, 399 phase-detect AF points, internal 4K video, ISO 102400, silent shutter mode, dual card slots (1 UHS-II, 1 UHS-I/Memory Stick Duo), 10 fps continuous shooting.
- Sony Alpha ILCE-7RM4 (α7R IV) - 61 MP (26 MP APS-C crop-mode, 240.8 MP Pixel Shift) back-illuminated BSI-CMOS sensor, built-in 5.5 stop 5-axis image stabilizer, 567 phase-detect AF points, internal 4K/30p video w/ 8b S-Log 2/3, ISO 102400, silent shutter mode, dual card slots (2x UHS-II), 10 fps continuous AF shooting, 802.11ac + NFC + Bluetooth.
- Sony Alpha ILCE-7SM2 (α7S II) - 12 MP sensor, built-in 5-axis image stabilizer, 169 phase-detect AF points, internal 4K video, ISO 409600, and silent shutter mode.
- Sony Alpha ILCE-9 (α9) - 24 MP sensor, built-in 5-axis image stabilizer, 693 phase-detect AF points, internal 4K video, ISO 51200 (expandable to 204800), silent shutter mode, dual card slots (1 UHS-II, 1 UHS-I/Memory Stick Duo), 20 fps continuous shooting, 60 fps live view (in either single-shot or continuous mode)

== See also ==
- List of Sony E-mount cameras
- Sony E-mount system
- Sony Multi Interface Shoe
- Sony SLT camera
- Electronic viewfinder
- Sony ILCA camera

Family	Level	Format	'10	2011		2012	2013	2014	2015	2016	2017	2018	2019	2020	2021	2022	2023	2024	2025	2026
Alpha (α)	Indust	FF																ILX-LR1 ^{●}		
Alpha (α)	Cine line	FF													_{m} FX6 ^{●}					
Alpha (α)	Cine line	FF													_{m} FX3 ^{AT●}					
Alpha (α)	Cine line	FF																		_{m} FX2 ^{AT●}
Alpha (α)	Flag	FF													_{m} α1 ^{FT●}				_{m} α1 II ^{FAT●}	
Alpha (α)	Speed	FF										_{m} α9 ^{FT●}			_{m} α9 II ^{FT●}				_{m} α9 III ^{FAT●}	
Alpha (α)	Sens	FF							_{m} α7S ^{●}	_{m} α7S II ^{F●}					_{m} α7S III ^{AT●}					
Alpha (α)	Hi-Res	FF						_{m} α7R ^{●}		_{m} α7R II ^{F●}		_{m} α7R III ^{FT●}		_{m} α7R IV ^{FT●}			_{m} α7R V ^{FAT●}			
Alpha (α)	Basic	FF						_{m} α7 ^{F●}	_{m} α7 II ^{F●}				_{m} α7 III ^{FT●}			_{m} α7 IV ^{AT●}				
Alpha (α)	Compact	FF																_{m} α7CR ^{AT●}		
Alpha (α)	Compact	FF													_{m} α7C ^{AT●}			_{m} α7C II ^{AT●}		
Alpha (α)	Vlog	FF																_{m} ZV-E1 ^{AT●}		
Alpha (α)	Cine	APS-C															_{m} FX30 ^{AT●}			
Alpha (α)	Adv	APS-C			_{s} NEX-7 ^{F●}						_{m} α6500 ^{FT●}			_{m} α6600 ^{FT●}				_{m} α6700 ^{AT●}		
Alpha (α)	Mid-range	APS-C				_{m} NEX-6 ^{F●}					_{m} α6300 ^{F●}		_{m} α6400 ^{F+T●}							
Alpha (α)	Mid-range	APS-C						_{m} α6000 ^{F●}						_{m} α6100 ^{FT●}						
Alpha (α)	Vlog	APS-C														_{m} ZV-E10 ^{AT●}			_{m} ZV-E10 II ^{AT●}	
Alpha (α)	Entry-level	APS-C	NEX-5 ^{F●}	NEX-5N ^{FT●}		NEX-5R ^{F+T●}	NEX-5T ^{F+T●}		α5100 ^{F+T●}											
Alpha (α)	Entry-level	APS-C	NEX-3 ^{F●}	NEX-C3 ^{F●}		NEX-F3 ^{F+●}	NEX-3N ^{F+●}	α5000 ^{F+●}												
DSLR-style		APS-C					_{m} α3000 ^{●}		_{m} α3500 ^{●}											
SmartShot		APS-C							QX1 ^{M●}											
CineAlta	Cine line	FF										VENICE				VENICE 2				
CineAlta	Cine line	FF																BURANO		
XDCAM	Cine line	FF												_{m} FX9						
XDCAM	Docu	S35							_{m} FS7		_{m} FS7 II									
XDCAM	Mobile	S35								_{m} FS5			_{m} FS5 II							
NXCAM	Pro	S35		NEX-FS100		NEX-FS700	NEX-FS700R													
NXCAM	APS-C					NEX-EA50														
Handycam	FF					_{m} NEX-VG900														
Handycam	APS-C		_{s} NEX-VG10		_{s} NEX-VG20	_{m} NEX-VG30														
Security		FF									SNC-VB770									
Security		FF									UMC-S3C									
Family	Level	Format																		
Family	Level	Format	'10	2011		2012	2013	2014	2015	2016	2017	2018	2019	2020	2021	2022	2023	2024	2025	2026
