= Zeiss Batis Sonnar T* 85mm F1.8 =

Zeiss Batis Sonnar T* 1.8/85mm
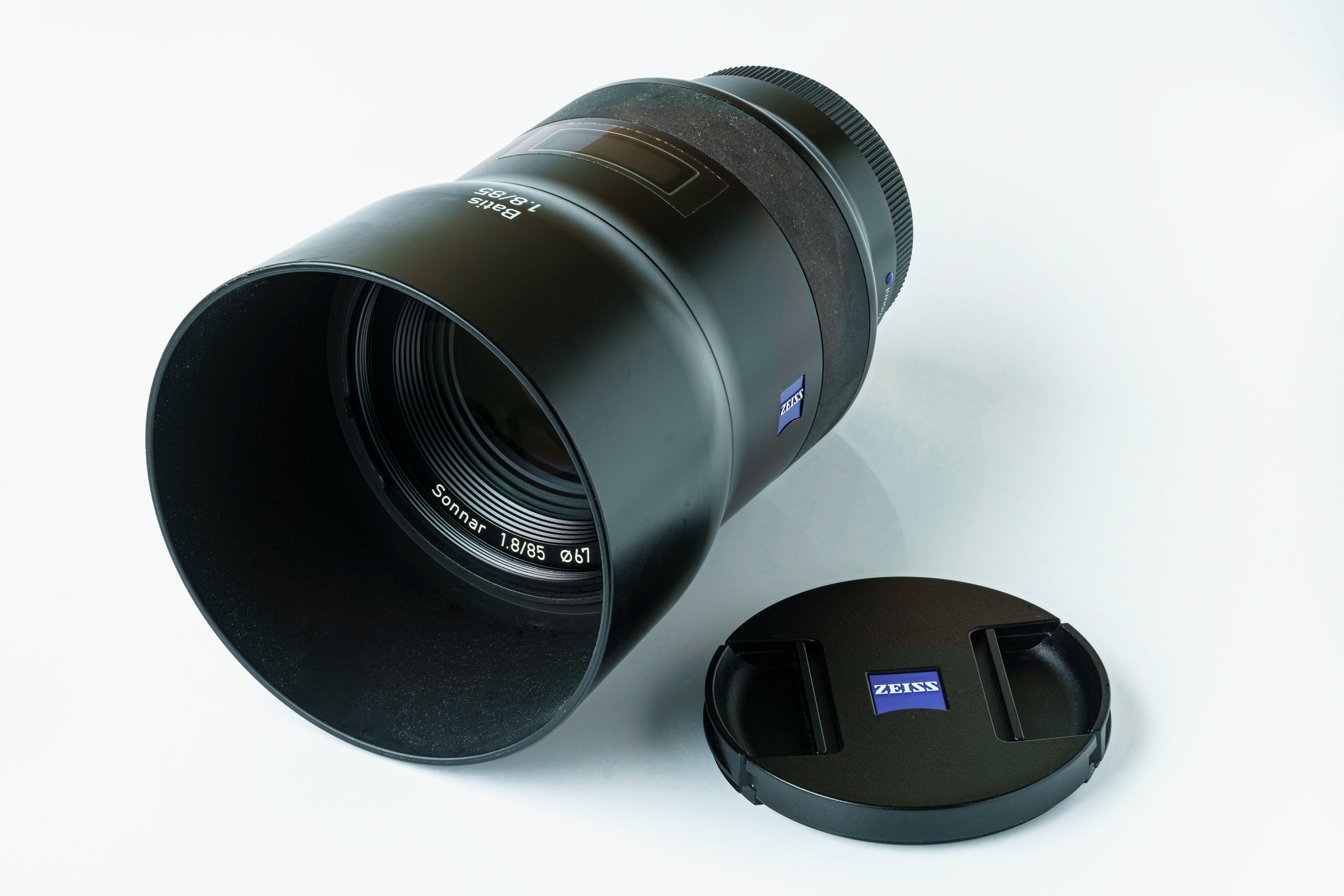
- Internal focussing. Weight and length without lens caps. Wherever values from referenced sources differ, values stated by manufacturer will prevail.
- Maker: Zeiss
- Lens mount(s): Sony E-mount

Technical data
- Type: Prime
- Focus drive: Linear Motor
- Focal length: 85
- Image format: 35mm full-frame
- Aperture (max/min): f1.8 – f/22
- Close focus distance: 0.80 metres (2.6 ft)
- Max. magnification: 1:7.9
- Diaphragm blades: 9 (circular)
- Construction: 11 elements in 8 groups

Features
- Manual focus override: Yes Yes
- Weather-sealing: Yes Yes
- Lens-based stabilization: Yes Yes
- Aperture ring: No No
- Unique features: Digital focus OLED distance scale displays both distance and depth of field; Optical image stabilizer; Internal focussing element
- Application: Portrait, Low Light

Physical
- Max. length: 92 millimetres (3.6 in)
- Diameter: 95 millimetres (3.7 in)
- Weight: 452 grams (0.996 lb)
- Filter diameter: M67 x 0.75

Accessories
- Lens hood: supplied
- Case: not supplied

Angle of view
- Horizontal: 24°
- Vertical: 16°
- Diagonal: 29°

History
- Introduction: 2015

Retail info
- MSRP: 1199 USD USD

The Zeiss Batis Sonnar T* 1.8/85mm is a full-frame (FE) portrait prime lens for the Sony E-mount, announced by Zeiss on April 22, 2015.

Though designed for Sony's full frame E-mount cameras, the lens can be used on Sony's APS-C E-mount camera bodies, with an equivalent full-frame field-of-view of 127.5mm.

== Build quality ==
The lens designer is Takahiko Sakai of Tamron.

The lens features a minimalist weather resistant plastic construction with a matte black finish and a rubber focus ring. Along with the Zeiss Batis Distagon T* 25mm F2, the Batis Sonnar 85mm was one of the first two lenses in which the traditional distance scale on the lens is replaced with an OLED display. The OLED display is integrated into the top of the lens barrel, and highlights the focus distance and depth of field range of the lens, which can be set to display at all times, never, or only when focusing manually.

== Image quality ==
The lens is renowned for having exceptional sharpness and creamy smooth bokeh.

== See also ==
- List of Zeiss Batis lenses
- List of third-party E-mount lenses
- Zeiss Sonnar
- Sony FE 85mm F1.8
- Sony FE 85mm F1.4 GM
