= Sony FE 85mm F1.8 =

- Maker: Sony
- Lens mount(s): Sony E-mount

Technical data
- Type: Prime
- Focus drive: Linear autofocus
- Focal length: 85mm
- Image format: 35mm full-frame
- Aperture (max/min): f/1.8-22.0
- Close focus distance: 0.80 metres (2.6 ft)
- Max. magnification: 1:8 (0.13x)
- Diaphragm blades: 9
- Construction: 9 elements in 8 groups

Features
- Manual focus override: Yes Yes
- Weather-sealing: Yes Yes
- Lens-based stabilization: No No
- Aperture ring: No No
- Application: Portrait, Low-Light

Physical
- Max. length: 82 millimetres (3.2 in)
- Diameter: 78 millimetres (3.1 in)
- Weight: 371 grams (0.818 lb)
- Filter diameter: 67mm

Accessories
- Lens hood: Barrel-type

History
- Introduction: 2017

Retail info
- MSRP: $599 USD

The Sony FE 85mm F1.8 is a short telephoto full-frame prime lens for the Sony E-mount, released by Sony on February 7, 2017.

The lens is one of Sony's first native lens offerings for the 85mm focal length. Though designed for Sony's full frame E-mount cameras, the lens can be used on Sony's APS-C E-mount camera bodies, with an equivalent full-frame field-of-view of 127.5mm.

== Build quality ==
The lens features a weather resistant plastic exterior over plastic internals. It showcases recessed front lens element, focusing ring, and a matte black finish. On the side of the lens is a programmable focus-hold button.

== Image quality ==
The lens is one of Sony's sharpest offerings for their E-mount cameras. The lens suffers from mild vignetting and almost no visible distortion or chromatic aberration.

== See also ==
- List of Sony E-mount lenses
- Sony FE 85mm F1.4 GM
- Zeiss Batis Sonnar T* 85mm F1.8
