= Zeiss Batis Distagon T* 25mm F2 =

Zeiss Batis Distagon T* 2/25mm
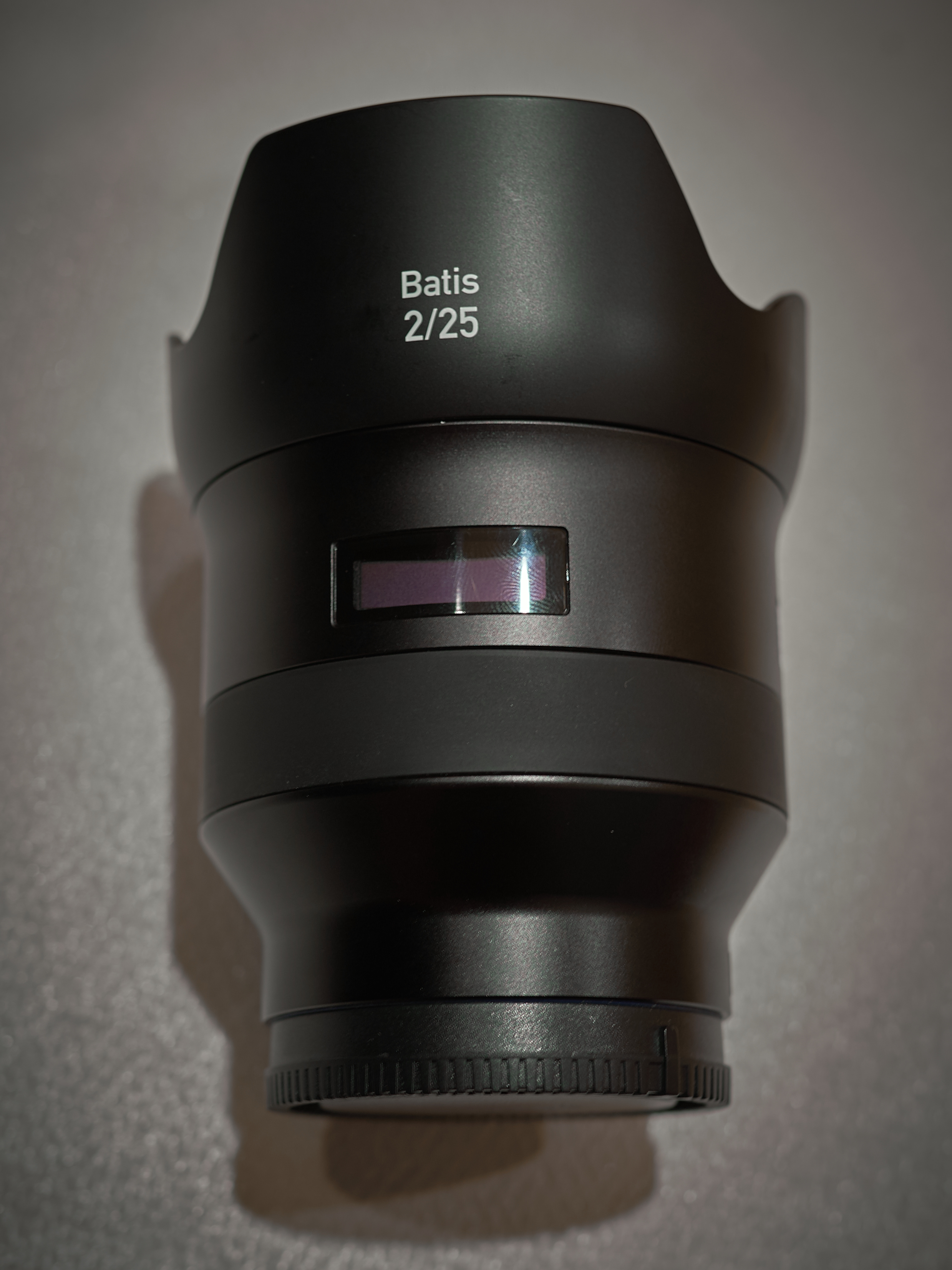
- Zeiss Batis f/2.0 25 mm
- Maker: Zeiss
- Lens mount(s): Sony E-mount

Technical data
- Type: Prime
- Image format: 35mm full-frame
- Close focus distance: 0.20 metres (0.66 ft)
- Construction: 10 elements in 8 groups

Features
- Manual focus override: Yes Yes
- Weather-sealing: Yes Yes
- Lens-based stabilization: No No
- Aperture ring: No No
- Unique features: Digital focus distance scale
- Application: Landscape, Architectural

Physical
- Max. length: 78 millimetres (3.1 in)
- Diameter: 92 millimetres (3.6 in)
- Weight: 335 grams (0.739 lb)
- Filter diameter: 67mm

History
- Introduction: 2015

The Zeiss Batis Distagon T* 2/25mm is a full-frame (FE) wide-angle prime lens for the Sony E-mount, announced by Zeiss on April 22, 2015.

Though designed for Sony's full frame E-mount cameras, the lens can be used on Sony's APS-C E-mount camera bodies, with an equivalent full-frame field-of-view of 37.5mm.

== Build quality ==
The lens features a weather resistant aluminum barrel construction with a matte black finish and a rubber focus ring. Along with the Zeiss Batis Sonnar T* 85mm F1.8, the Batis Distagon 25mm was one of the first two lenses in which the traditional distance scale on the lens is replaced with an OLED display. The OLED display is integrated into the top of the lens barrel, and highlights the focus distance and depth of field range of the lens, which can be set to display at all times, never, or only when focusing manually.

== See also ==
- List of third-party E-mount lenses
- Zeiss Loxia 2.8/21mm
- Sony FE 28mm F2
- Zeiss Distagon
