= Sony FE 85mm F1.4 GM =

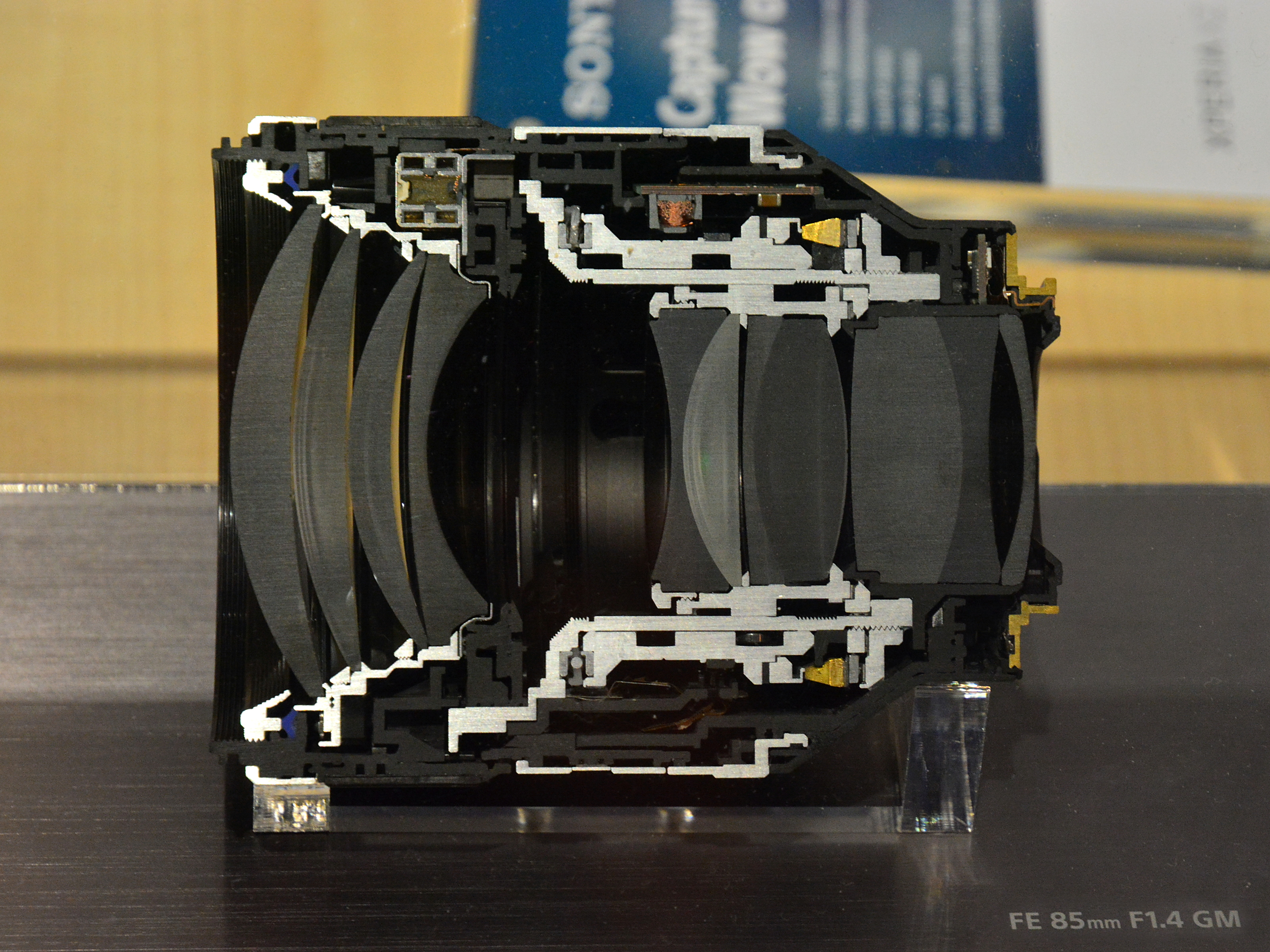
- Maker: Sony
- Lens mount(s): Sony E-mount

Technical data
- Type: Prime
- Focus drive: Ultrasonic
- Focal length: 85mm
- Image format: 35mm full-frame
- Aperture (max/min): f/1.4-16.0
- Close focus distance: 0.80 metres (2.6 ft)
- Max. magnification: 1:8 (0.12x)
- Diaphragm blades: 11
- Construction: 11 elements in 8 groups

Features
- Manual focus override: Yes Yes
- Weather-sealing: Yes Yes
- Lens-based stabilization: No No
- Aperture ring: Yes Yes
- Unique features: G-Master
- Application: Portrait, Low-Light

Physical
- Max. length: 108 millimetres (4.3 in)
- Diameter: 90 millimetres (3.5 in)
- Weight: 820 grams (1.81 lb)
- Filter diameter: 77mm

History
- Introduction: 2016

Retail info
- MSRP: $1799 USD

The Sony FE 85mm F1.4 GM is a premium short telephoto full-frame prime lens for the Sony E-mount, released by Sony on February 3, 2016.

The lens is Sony's first native lens offering for the 85mm focal length. Though designed for Sony's full frame E-mount cameras, the lens can be used on Sony's APS-C E-mount camera bodies, with an equivalent full-frame field-of-view of 127.5mm.

== Build quality ==
The lens features a weather resistant plastic exterior over plastic internals with a matte black finish. It showcases recessed front lens element, focusing ring, and aperture ring. On the side of the lens is a programmable focus-hold button, Autofocus-Manual focus switch, and the red G-Master branding.

== Image quality ==
The lens is one of Sony's sharpest offerings for their E-mount cameras. The lens suffers from almost no vignetting, visible distortion or chromatic aberration. The Bokeh produced by the lens at its maximum aperture is smooth.

== See also ==
- List of Sony E-mount lenses
- Sony FE 85mm F1.8
- Zeiss Batis 85mm F1.8
