= Sony Handycam NEX-VG10 =

The Sony Handycam NEX-VG10 (model variants NEX-VG10E, NEX-VG10A, NEX-VG10J) was the large sensor interchangeable-lens video camera made and distributed by Sony in 2010–2011. It uses Sony E-mount camera lenses that were first used on the Sony NEX-3 and Sony NEX-5. It is capable of shooting in 1920×1080 full high definition using a large APS-C sensor. The video is captured in the AVCHD format. When capturing still photos the NEX-VG10 is capable of 14-megapixel stills. The camera kit comes with an 18–200 mm lens that will also be compatible with the NEX Mirrorless interchangeable lens camera systems. The 16 mm ultra wide and 18–55 mm lens E-mount lenses will also work with full auto-focus support. The built-on microphone is made of four directional mics that record in two-way stereo with the ability to capture both front and back sounds. The mic handle also has support for a hot shoe to connect a supported flash gun and a cold shoe to add on extra accessories. There will also be a 3.5 mm microphone jack to add an external microphone for more accurate sound capture. First shipments of the NEX-VG10 commenced in September 2010. Its launch price is 1999 US dollars and it comes in a kit with a Sony SAL-18200 lens with hood and a free download of Vegas Movie Studio.

On 24 August 2011 the successor, the Sony Handycam NEX-VG20 was announced.

In September 2012, the successor, the Sony Handycam NEX-VG30 was announced with a 16.1 MP APS-C CMOS sensor.

Sony simultaneously announced the NEX-VG900, a full-frame, 24.3 MP video camera with a 35 mm Exmor CMOS sensor.

== Compatible lenses ==
The NEX-VG10 is able to support all of E-mount lenses in addition to the kit lens. A 16 mm pancake and standard zoom 18–55 mm lens that comes with most Alpha NEX mirrorless cameras are fully supported. In addition a 0.62× converter add-on lens (giving a fish eye effect) will be able to work with the 16 mm pancake. There is a 0.75× wide-angle converter for the 16mm lens available. E-mount series of lenses will be fully supported with auto-focus. The optional LA-EA1 adapter allows the camera to use A-mount lenses, with auto-focus for SAM and SSM lenses. The more advanced adapter LA-EA2, announced on 24 August 2011, will make autofocus available to all AF lenses. A wide range of adaptors are available for Nikon, Canon, etc. Any APS-C or full-frame 35 mm lens should in principle be usable on the camera, as the backfocus requirement is far less than for a SLR.

== See also ==
- List of Sony E-mount cameras

Family	Level	Format	'10	2011		2012	2013	2014	2015	2016	2017	2018	2019	2020	2021	2022	2023	2024	2025	2026
Alpha (α)	Indust	FF																ILX-LR1 ^{●}		
Alpha (α)	Cine line	FF													_{m} FX6 ^{●}					
Alpha (α)	Cine line	FF																		_{m} FX5 ^{AT●}
Alpha (α)	Cine line	FF													_{m} FX3 ^{AT●}					
Alpha (α)	Cine line	FF																		_{m} FX2 ^{AT●}
Alpha (α)	Flag	FF													_{m} α1 ^{FT●}				_{m} α1 II ^{FAT●}	
Alpha (α)	Speed	FF										_{m} α9 ^{FT●}			_{m} α9 II ^{FT●}				_{m} α9 III ^{FAT●}	
Alpha (α)	Sens	FF							_{m} α7S ^{●}	_{m} α7S II ^{F●}					_{m} α7S III ^{AT●}					
Alpha (α)	Hi-Res	FF						_{m} α7R ^{●}		_{m} α7R II ^{F●}		_{m} α7R III ^{FT●}		_{m} α7R IV ^{FT●}			_{m} α7R V ^{FAT●}			_{m} α7R VI ^{FAT●}
Alpha (α)	Basic	FF						_{m} α7 ^{F●}	_{m} α7 II ^{F●}				_{m} α7 III ^{FT●}			_{m} α7 IV ^{AT●}				_{m} α7 V ^{FAT●}
Alpha (α)	Compact	FF																_{m} α7CR ^{AT●}		
Alpha (α)	Compact	FF													_{m} α7C ^{AT●}			_{m} α7C II ^{AT●}		
Alpha (α)	Vlog	FF																_{m} ZV-E1 ^{AT●}		
Alpha (α)	Cine	APS-C															_{m} FX30 ^{AT●}			
Alpha (α)	Adv	APS-C			_{s} NEX-7 ^{F●}						_{m} α6500 ^{FT●}			_{m} α6600 ^{FT●}				_{m} α6700 ^{AT●}		
Alpha (α)	Mid-range	APS-C				_{m} NEX-6 ^{F●}					_{m} α6300 ^{F●}		_{m} α6400 ^{F+T●}							
Alpha (α)	Mid-range	APS-C						_{m} α6000 ^{F●}						_{m} α6100 ^{FT●}						
Alpha (α)	Vlog	APS-C														_{m} ZV-E10 ^{AT●}			_{m} ZV-E10 II ^{AT●}	
Alpha (α)	Entry-level	APS-C	NEX-5 ^{F●}	NEX-5N ^{FT●}		NEX-5R ^{F+T●}	NEX-5T ^{F+T●}		α5100 ^{F+T●}											
Alpha (α)	Entry-level	APS-C	NEX-3 ^{F●}	NEX-C3 ^{F●}		NEX-F3 ^{F+●}	NEX-3N ^{F+●}	α5000 ^{F+●}												
DSLR-style		APS-C					_{m} α3000 ^{●}		_{m} α3500 ^{●}											
SmartShot		APS-C							QX1 ^{M●}											
CineAlta	Cine line	FF										VENICE				VENICE 2				
CineAlta	Cine line	FF																BURANO		
XDCAM	Cine line	FF												_{m} FX9						
XDCAM	Docu	S35							_{m} FS7		_{m} FS7 II									
XDCAM	Mobile	S35								_{m} FS5			_{m} FS5 II							
NXCAM	Pro	S35		NEX-FS100		NEX-FS700	NEX-FS700R													
NXCAM	APS-C					NEX-EA50														
Handycam	FF					_{m} NEX-VG900														
Handycam	APS-C		_{s} NEX-VG10		_{s} NEX-VG20	_{m} NEX-VG30														
Security		FF									SNC-VB770									
Security		FF									UMC-S3C									
Family	Level	Format																		
Family	Level	Format	'10	2011		2012	2013	2014	2015	2016	2017	2018	2019	2020	2021	2022	2023	2024	2025	2026
