= Yasuhara =

Yasuhara (written: 安原) is a Japanese surname. Notable people with the surname include:

- Hirokazu Yasuhara (安原 広和, born 1965), Japanese video game designer
- Masahiro Yasuhara (安原 昌弘, born 1963), Japanese cyclist
- Nariyasu Yasuhara (安原 成泰, born 1968), Japanese footballer and manager
- Reiko Yasuhara (安原 麗子, born 1969), Japanese voice actress
- Yoshito Yasuhara (安原 義人, born 1949), Japanese actor and voice actor
