= Sony α3000 =

2013 APS-C mirrorless camera

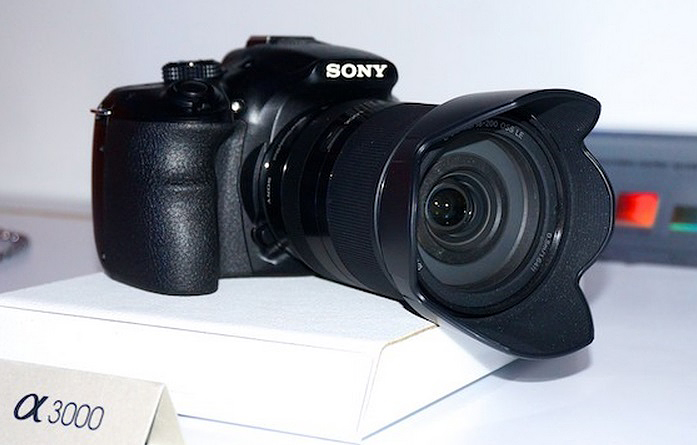

Overview
- Maker: Sony

Sensor/medium
- Sensor type: CMOS
- Sensor size: 23.5 mm × 15.6 mm (0.93 in × 0.61 in) (APS-C type)
- Maximum resolution: 5456 × 3632 (20 megapixels)
- Film speed: 100-16000

Focusing
- Focus areas: 25 focus points

Shutter
- Continuous shooting: 3 frames per second

Viewfinder
- Viewfinder magnification: 0.7
- Frame coverage: 100%

Image processing
- Image processor: BIONZ image processor
- White balance: Yes

General
- LCD screen: 3 inches (76 mm) with 230,400 dots
- Dimensions: 128 mm × 91 mm × 85 mm (5.0 in × 3.6 in × 3.3 in)
- Weight: 411 g (14.5 oz) including battery

The Sony α3000 (model ILCE-3000) is a DSLR-styled mirrorless camera announced by Sony on 27 August 2013. Sony α3000 comes with a newly developed APS-C Exmor sensor, ISO ranges touches 100–16000, Full HD at 60 fps. This was the first camera introduced in Sony's newly rebranded "ILCE" range.

In Australia, Mexico, Russia, Eastern Europe, the Middle East and Africa it was replaced in March 2014 with the Sony α3500, which is identical but sold with the cheaper Sony E 18-50mm F4-5.6 kit lens.

== Features ==
- Exmor APS HD CMOS sensor with 20.1 effective megapixel resolution
- BIONZ™ image processing engine
- 25 Point contrast detection Auto Focus system
- Shutter Speed 1/4000 to 30 Seconds plus Bulb
- Focus Peaking Level Display in different color
- Optional display of grid line for better framing of image
- Option to choose language on the screen
- Manual Focus Assist
- Face priority Tracking
- Digital zoom
- Scene Selection
- Sweep Panorama Mode
- HDR (in camera)

== See also ==
- List of Sony E-mount cameras

Family	Level	Format	'10	2011		2012	2013	2014	2015	2016	2017	2018	2019	2020	2021	2022	2023	2024	2025	2026
Alpha (α)	Indust	FF																ILX-LR1 ^{●}		
Alpha (α)	Cine line	FF													_{m} FX6 ^{●}					
Alpha (α)	Cine line	FF													_{m} FX3 ^{AT●}					
Alpha (α)	Cine line	FF																		_{m} FX2 ^{AT●}
Alpha (α)	Flag	FF													_{m} α1 ^{FT●}				_{m} α1 II ^{FAT●}	
Alpha (α)	Speed	FF										_{m} α9 ^{FT●}			_{m} α9 II ^{FT●}				_{m} α9 III ^{FAT●}	
Alpha (α)	Sens	FF							_{m} α7S ^{●}	_{m} α7S II ^{F●}					_{m} α7S III ^{AT●}					
Alpha (α)	Hi-Res	FF						_{m} α7R ^{●}		_{m} α7R II ^{F●}		_{m} α7R III ^{FT●}		_{m} α7R IV ^{FT●}			_{m} α7R V ^{FAT●}			
Alpha (α)	Basic	FF						_{m} α7 ^{F●}	_{m} α7 II ^{F●}				_{m} α7 III ^{FT●}			_{m} α7 IV ^{AT●}				
Alpha (α)	Compact	FF																_{m} α7CR ^{AT●}		
Alpha (α)	Compact	FF													_{m} α7C ^{AT●}			_{m} α7C II ^{AT●}		
Alpha (α)	Vlog	FF																_{m} ZV-E1 ^{AT●}		
Alpha (α)	Cine	APS-C															_{m} FX30 ^{AT●}			
Alpha (α)	Adv	APS-C			_{s} NEX-7 ^{F●}						_{m} α6500 ^{FT●}			_{m} α6600 ^{FT●}				_{m} α6700 ^{AT●}		
Alpha (α)	Mid-range	APS-C				_{m} NEX-6 ^{F●}					_{m} α6300 ^{F●}		_{m} α6400 ^{F+T●}							
Alpha (α)	Mid-range	APS-C						_{m} α6000 ^{F●}						_{m} α6100 ^{FT●}						
Alpha (α)	Vlog	APS-C														_{m} ZV-E10 ^{AT●}			_{m} ZV-E10 II ^{AT●}	
Alpha (α)	Entry-level	APS-C	NEX-5 ^{F●}	NEX-5N ^{FT●}		NEX-5R ^{F+T●}	NEX-5T ^{F+T●}		α5100 ^{F+T●}											
Alpha (α)	Entry-level	APS-C	NEX-3 ^{F●}	NEX-C3 ^{F●}		NEX-F3 ^{F+●}	NEX-3N ^{F+●}	α5000 ^{F+●}												
DSLR-style		APS-C					_{m} α3000 ^{●}		_{m} α3500 ^{●}											
SmartShot		APS-C							QX1 ^{M●}											
CineAlta	Cine line	FF										VENICE				VENICE 2				
CineAlta	Cine line	FF																BURANO		
XDCAM	Cine line	FF												_{m} FX9						
XDCAM	Docu	S35							_{m} FS7		_{m} FS7 II									
XDCAM	Mobile	S35								_{m} FS5			_{m} FS5 II							
NXCAM	Pro	S35		NEX-FS100		NEX-FS700	NEX-FS700R													
NXCAM	APS-C					NEX-EA50														
Handycam	FF					_{m} NEX-VG900														
Handycam	APS-C		_{s} NEX-VG10		_{s} NEX-VG20	_{m} NEX-VG30														
Security		FF									SNC-VB770									
Security		FF									UMC-S3C									
Family	Level	Format																		
Family	Level	Format	'10	2011		2012	2013	2014	2015	2016	2017	2018	2019	2020	2021	2022	2023	2024	2025	2026
