= Sony α9 =

2017 full-frame mirrorless camera

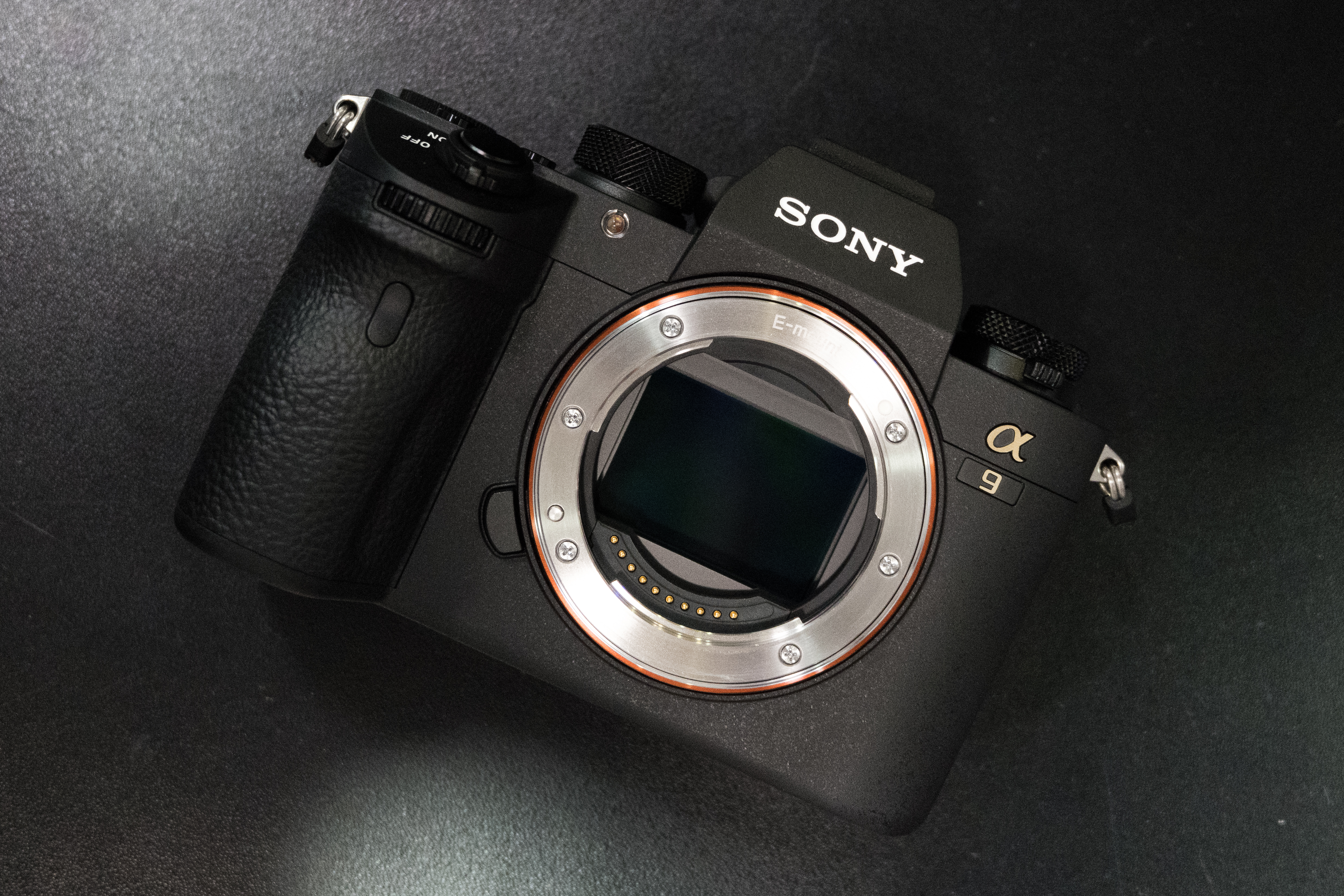

Overview
- Maker: Sony Group
- Type: Full-frame mirrorless interchangeable-lens camera
- Intro price: 4,500 USD

Lens
- Lens mount: Sony E-mount

Sensor/medium
- Sensor: 35.6×23.8 mm Exmor full-frame RS CMOS Sensor
- Maximum resolution: 6000×4000 (3:2) (24.2 megapixel)
- Film speed: Auto, 100-51,200 expandable to 204,800
- Storage media: Dual memory card slots. α9 supports Memory Stick Pro Duo, Pro-HG Duo, SD, SDHC, SDXC; α9 II supports only SD formats. Slot 1 - SD (UHS-I/II compliant). Slot 2 - Multi slot for Memory Stick Duo/SD (UHS-I compliant) on α9; SD (UHS-1/II compliant) on α9 II

Focusing
- Focus modes: Contrast Detect (sensor), Phase Detect, Multi-area, Center, Selective single-point, Single, Continuous, Face Detection, Live View

Exposure/metering
- Exposure metering: Multi-segment, Center-weighted, Spot, Spot Standard/Large, Entire Screen Avg., Highlight

Shutter
- Shutter: Electronically-controlled, vertical-traverse, focal-plane shutter
- Shutter speed range: 1/32,000 (Electronic) / 1/8000 (Mechanical) - 30 sec, BULB
- Continuous shooting: 20 frame/s electronic (12bit), 5 frame/s mechanical

Viewfinder
- Viewfinder: Built-in 3.68 Million dot Quad-VGA OLED Electronic viewfinder

General
- LCD screen: 2.95 in (75 mm) Tilting LCD, 1.44 megapixel
- Battery: NP-FZ100 Lithium-Ion rechargeable battery
- Body features: Anti Dust System, Image Stabilization with Sensor-Shift mechanism
- Dimensions: 126.9 mm × 95.6 mm × 63 mm (5.00 in × 3.76 in × 2.48 in)
- Weight: Approx. 673 g (23.7 oz) including battery and memory card
- Made in: Thailand

Chronology
- Successor: Sony α9 II

The Sony α9 (the α is sometimes spelled out as Alpha), Model ILCE-9, is a full-frame mirrorless interchangeable-lens camera. It was Sony's flagship camera as of 2017. The camera is not the successor to the α7 line of digital cameras but supplements it. Announced on 19 April 2017, the α9 is characterized by Sony as a true professional mirrorless camera system. The α9 is being compared with the Nikon D5 and the Canon EOS-1D X Mark II.

Sony initially priced the α9 at $4,499 with an availability date in May 2017.

The headline feature of the α9 is the 20 frames per second with a buffer of 240 raw or 362 JPEG images. This is accomplished without temporarily blacking out the finder for each exposure, unlike a DSLR. Sony α9 was the first e-mount camera to use the larger NP-FZ100 battery with nearly double the capacity of the previous smaller NP-FW50 battery.

The Sony α9 II, announced in October 2019, succeeds the α9. The new camera has updated ergonomics, connectivity, and a faster 10 fps burst with the mechanical shutter. Additionally, the α9 II breaks compatibility with the Memory Stick format; both slots are now SD and support the UHS-II protocol.

The Sony α9 III has been announced in November 2023, featuring a global shutter and 120 fps burst.

== Features ==
- Stacked Exmor RS CMOS Full-Frame sensor
- 693-point focal-plane phase detection AF
- 5-axis image stabilization
- LCD touchscreen (3 inch/7.5 cm) with tilt functionality
- 3.68 Million dot Quad-VGA OLED 1.3 cm (0.5 inch) electronic viewfinder
- 1200-zone evaluative light metering
- Built-in Wi-Fi, NFC and Bluetooth
- LAN input for transferring files via FTP
- LED-auto focus illuminator
- Multi Interface Shoe
- My Menu system with up to 72 assignable functions
- Joystick for positioning of the 693 focus points
- Dual memory card slots:
  - α9: One for UHS-I and one for UHS-II.
  - α9 II: Both support UHS-II.

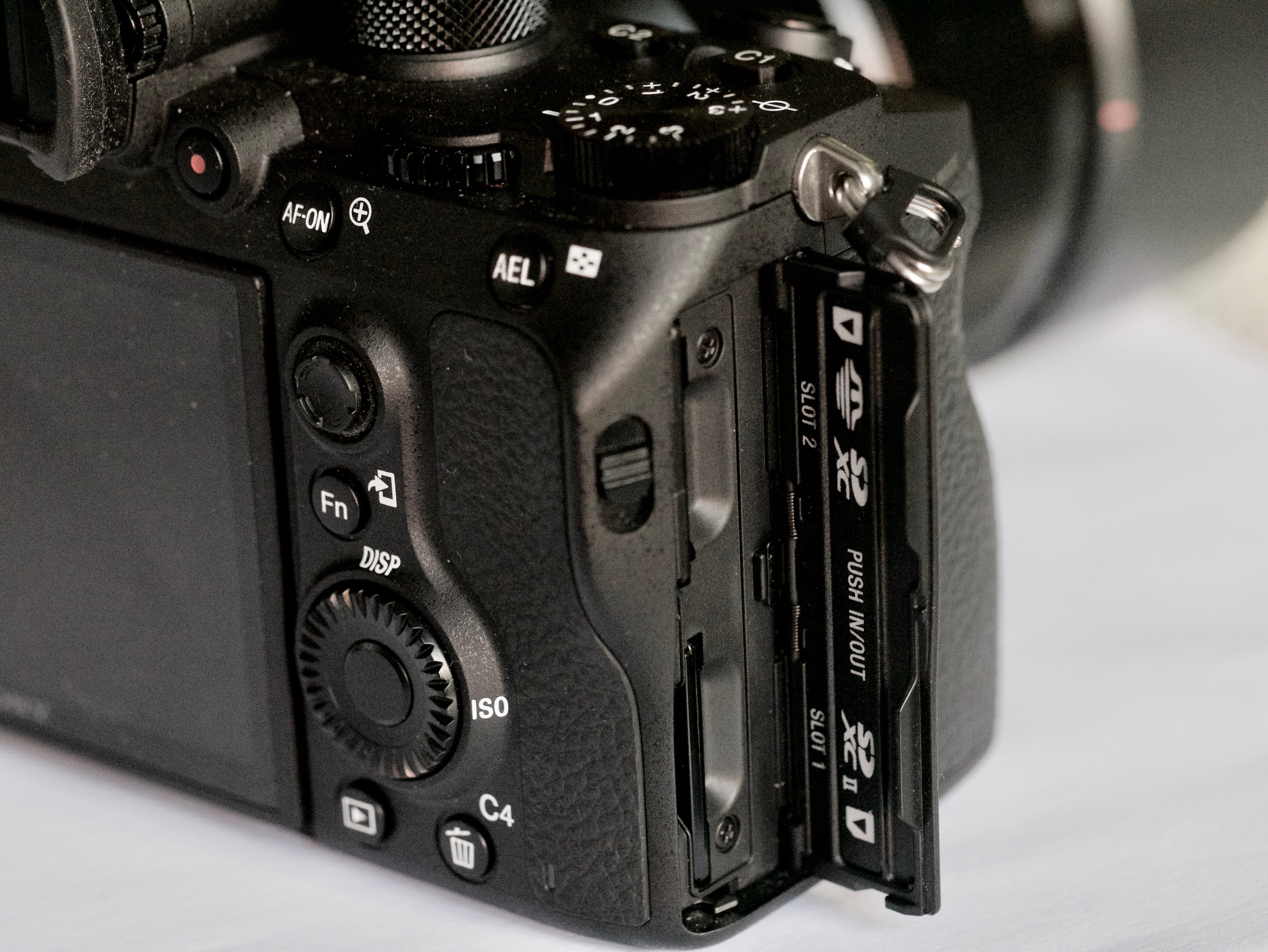
Dual memory card slots of the Sony α9

1 / SDXC (UHS-I) slot	2 / SDXC II (UHS-II) slot

== Reception ==
Initial hands-on of the α9 have been positive with multiple reviewers praising the company for listening to its users.

The α9 won Camera Grand Prix 2018 Camera of the Year.

== See also ==
- List of Sony E-mount cameras
- Sony α7 II
- Sony α7 III
- Sony α7R II

Family	Level	Format	'10	2011		2012	2013	2014	2015	2016	2017	2018	2019	2020	2021	2022	2023	2024	2025	2026
Alpha (α)	Indust	FF																ILX-LR1 ^{●}		
Alpha (α)	Cine line	FF													_{m} FX6 ^{●}					
Alpha (α)	Cine line	FF																		_{m} FX5 ^{AT●}
Alpha (α)	Cine line	FF													_{m} FX3 ^{AT●}					
Alpha (α)	Cine line	FF																		_{m} FX2 ^{AT●}
Alpha (α)	Flag	FF													_{m} α1 ^{FT●}				_{m} α1 II ^{FAT●}	
Alpha (α)	Speed	FF										_{m} α9 ^{FT●}			_{m} α9 II ^{FT●}				_{m} α9 III ^{FAT●}	
Alpha (α)	Sens	FF							_{m} α7S ^{●}	_{m} α7S II ^{F●}					_{m} α7S III ^{AT●}					
Alpha (α)	Hi-Res	FF						_{m} α7R ^{●}		_{m} α7R II ^{F●}		_{m} α7R III ^{FT●}		_{m} α7R IV ^{FT●}			_{m} α7R V ^{FAT●}			_{m} α7R VI ^{FAT●}
Alpha (α)	Basic	FF						_{m} α7 ^{F●}	_{m} α7 II ^{F●}				_{m} α7 III ^{FT●}			_{m} α7 IV ^{AT●}				_{m} α7 V ^{FAT●}
Alpha (α)	Compact	FF																_{m} α7CR ^{AT●}		
Alpha (α)	Compact	FF													_{m} α7C ^{AT●}			_{m} α7C II ^{AT●}		
Alpha (α)	Vlog	FF																_{m} ZV-E1 ^{AT●}		
Alpha (α)	Cine	APS-C															_{m} FX30 ^{AT●}			
Alpha (α)	Adv	APS-C			_{s} NEX-7 ^{F●}						_{m} α6500 ^{FT●}			_{m} α6600 ^{FT●}				_{m} α6700 ^{AT●}		
Alpha (α)	Mid-range	APS-C				_{m} NEX-6 ^{F●}					_{m} α6300 ^{F●}		_{m} α6400 ^{F+T●}							
Alpha (α)	Mid-range	APS-C						_{m} α6000 ^{F●}						_{m} α6100 ^{FT●}						
Alpha (α)	Vlog	APS-C														_{m} ZV-E10 ^{AT●}			_{m} ZV-E10 II ^{AT●}	
Alpha (α)	Entry-level	APS-C	NEX-5 ^{F●}	NEX-5N ^{FT●}		NEX-5R ^{F+T●}	NEX-5T ^{F+T●}		α5100 ^{F+T●}											
Alpha (α)	Entry-level	APS-C	NEX-3 ^{F●}	NEX-C3 ^{F●}		NEX-F3 ^{F+●}	NEX-3N ^{F+●}	α5000 ^{F+●}												
DSLR-style		APS-C					_{m} α3000 ^{●}		_{m} α3500 ^{●}											
SmartShot		APS-C							QX1 ^{M●}											
CineAlta	Cine line	FF										VENICE				VENICE 2				
CineAlta	Cine line	FF																BURANO		
XDCAM	Cine line	FF												_{m} FX9						
XDCAM	Docu	S35							_{m} FS7		_{m} FS7 II									
XDCAM	Mobile	S35								_{m} FS5			_{m} FS5 II							
NXCAM	Pro	S35		NEX-FS100		NEX-FS700	NEX-FS700R													
NXCAM	APS-C					NEX-EA50														
Handycam	FF					_{m} NEX-VG900														
Handycam	APS-C		_{s} NEX-VG10		_{s} NEX-VG20	_{m} NEX-VG30														
Security		FF									SNC-VB770									
Security		FF									UMC-S3C									
Family	Level	Format																		
Family	Level	Format	'10	2011		2012	2013	2014	2015	2016	2017	2018	2019	2020	2021	2022	2023	2024	2025	2026
