= Sony NEX-5 =

2010 digital camera model

Sony α NEX-5
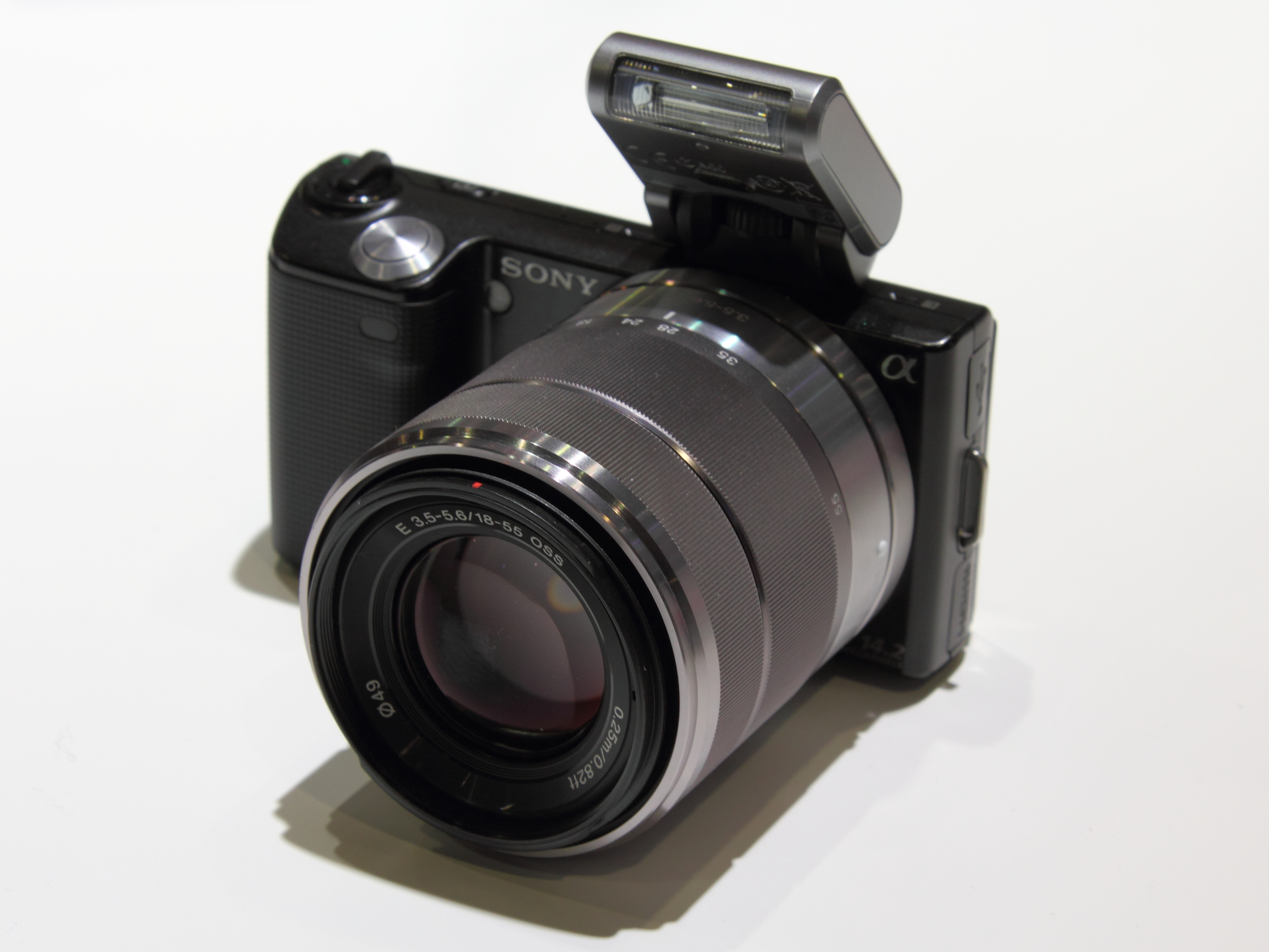

Overview
- Maker: Sony Group
- Type: Mirrorless interchangeable lens camera
- Intro price: $649.99 (with 16mm f2.8 lens) $699.99 (with 18-55mm 3.5-5.6 lens)

Lens
- Lens: Sony E-mount

Sensor/medium
- Sensor: 23.4 × 15.6 mm Exmor APS-C HD CMOS Sensor
- Maximum resolution: 4592 × 3056 (14.2 megapixels)
- Film speed: Auto, 200, 400, 800, 1600, 3200, 6400, 12800
- Storage media: Memory Stick Pro Duo, Pro-HG Duo, SD, SDHC, SDXC

Focusing
- Focus modes: Contrast-detection auto-focus, 25 multi-point, Centre-weighted, Flexible Spot

Exposure/metering
- Exposure modes: Intelligent Auto, Program, Aperture priority, Shutter priority, Manual, Scene modes
- Exposure metering: Multi-segment, Center-weighted, Spot
- Metering modes: Multi-segment, Centre-weighted, Spot

Flash
- Flash: External flash (bundled)

Shutter
- Shutter speed range: 1/4000 - 30 sec, BULB
- Continuous shooting: 2.3 frame/s, 7 frame/s in speed priority mode

Viewfinder
- Viewfinder: Optional external optical viewfinder

General
- LCD screen: 3.0 in (76 mm) XtraFine TruBlack LCD, 920,000 pixels
- Battery: NP-FW50, InfoLITHIUM, 7.2 V, 1080 mAh, 7.7 Wh, Lithium-Ion rechargeable battery
- Dimensions: 111 mm × 59 mm × 38 mm
- Weight: Approx. 287 g (10.1 oz) (camera body, card and battery)
- Made in: Japan

The Sony α NEX-5 is a digital camera launched on 11 May 2010. It is a mirrorless interchangeable lens camera with the body size of a larger model fairly compact point-and-shoot camera with a larger sensor size (APS-C) comparable to that of some digital single-lens reflex cameras. Its major competitors in the market were the cameras based on the micro 4/3 standard created by Panasonic and Olympus, and a few low end Canon, Nikon, and even Sony α DSLRs. The NEX-5 shoots 14.2 megapixel stills and has a 7 frame/s continuous shotmode. It has the capability to shoot 1920×1080i at 60 frame/s in AVCHD or 1440×1080p at 30 frame/s in MPEG4. The NEX-5 was replaced by the 16 megapixel NEX-5N in August 2011.

== Features ==
The α NEX-5 has features found in SLR cameras but also some that are normally found in point and shoots. The body of the α NEX-5 is made of magnesium alloy that separates the NEX-5 from the less expensive polymer NEX-3. Also different from the NEX-3 is video quality. The NEX-5 can shoot in AVCHD 1080/60i HD. There is a 7 frame/s continuous shot mode, with autofocus disabled after the first frame. The APS-C sized sensor has an ISO sensitivity up to 12,800. The camera software has special features like twilight mode and sweep panorama. The latter lets the photographer sweep across a city-sky line or similar long view and have the photos automatically stitched into a JPEG image on camera.

== Lenses ==
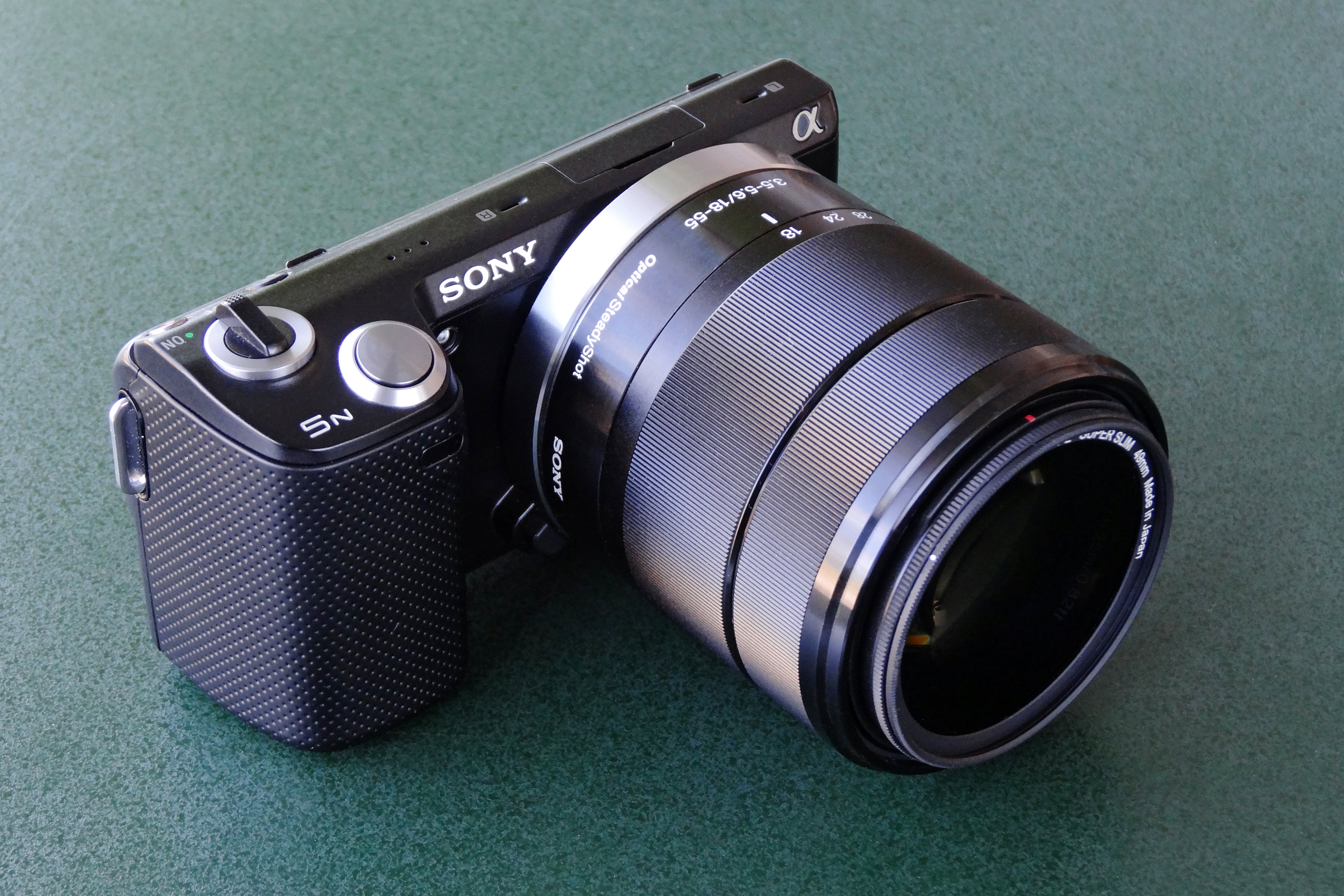
Sony NEX-5N with an E-mount SEL1855 lens

The NEX-5 along with its sister, the NEX-3, and also the Sony Handycam NEX-VG10 use a new lens mount system developed by Sony for NEX series and known as the Sony E-mount. Initially, there were three available lenses: an all-purpose 18–55 mm lens, an ultra wide pancake 16 mm lens, and a wide range 18–200 mm E-mount lens.

With the post-November 2010 firmware version 3 installed, and by using the (roughly US$200) Sony LA-EA1 adapter, the NEX series of cameras is able to electronically control the aperture and autofocus of Sony SSM/SAM A-mount lenses, and control the aperture of the other Sony/Minolta A-mount lenses with manual focus only. The (roughly US$400) Sony LA-EA2 adapter also supports autofocus with screw-drive A-mount lenses, firmware version 5 is required for this adapter.

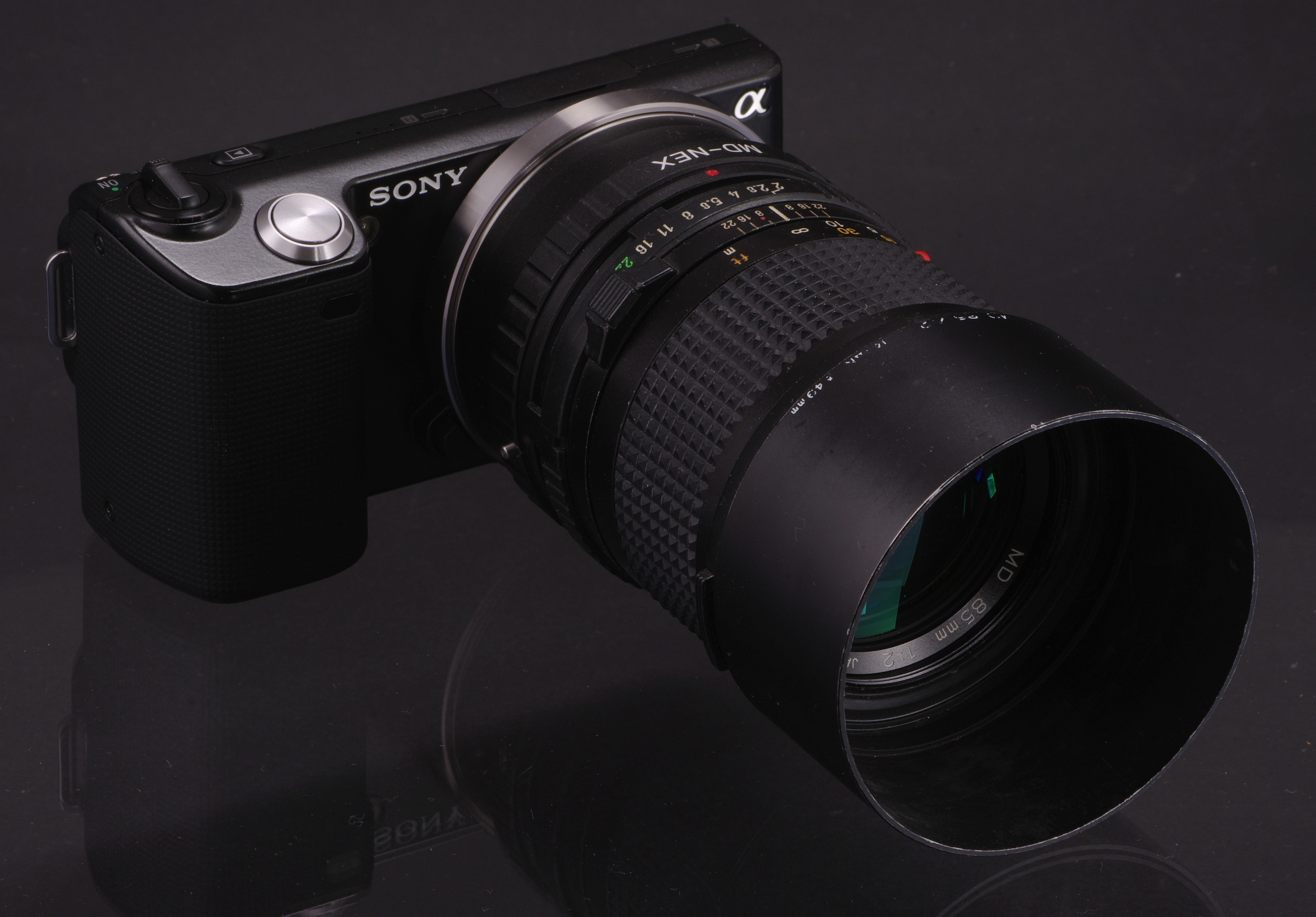
Minolta MD 2/85 mm adapted to NEX 5

Other third-party mechanical tube adapters are also available. These adapters enable the use of Canon FD-mount, Canon EF-mount (without aperture control), Contax G, M42 screw mount, Konica Hexanon AR-mount, Minolta SR-mount (MC/MD), Leica M and screw mount, Nikon F-mount (non-G), Pentax K-mount (non-DA), Olympus OM mount, T2 screw mount and Minolta/Konica Minolta/Sony A-mount lenses. The E-mount flange register is so short that it is possible to mount 45 mm or longer-focal-length non-focusing enlarging lenses on the NEX body, with the use of an intermediate focusing helicoid behind them.

Certain third-party mechanical adapters also provide circular control rings that provide some mechanical control of the aperture of Nikon G, Pentax DA and Canon EF lenses, as these do not have a mechanical aperture control ring on their lens barrels.

== Model definitions ==
The incomplete model number of NEX-3/NEX-5 series may include letter(s) at end. The definitions are:

- C: Not compatible with Eye-Fi function (NEX-3C and NEX-5C only)
- A: Supplied with E 2.8/16mm (SEL-16F28)
- D: Supplied with E 2.8/16mm (SEL-16F28) and E 3,5-5,6/18-55mm OSS (SEL-1855)
- H: Supplied with E 3.5-6.3/18-200mm OSS (SEL-18200)
- K: Supplied with E 3.5-5.6/18-55mm OSS (SEL-1855)
- L: Supplied with E 3.5-5.6/16-50mm OSS (SEL-1650)
- B: Body color is black
- N: Body color is black
- /N: Body color is gold (NEX-5D/N, Japan only)
- /P: Body color is pink (NEX-3D/P, Asia only)
- R: Body color is red
- S: Body color is silver
- /T: Body color is brown (NEX-3D/T, Asia only)
- 50i: 50 frames interlaced model
- 60i: 60 frames interlaced model

For example, NEX-5CK/B 50i is a NEX-5 supplied with E 18–55 mm zoom lens, not compatible with Eye-Fi function, body color black, and with 50i (not 60i) video support.

== See also ==
- Sony NEX-7
- List of smallest mirrorless cameras

Family	Level	Format	'10	2011		2012	2013	2014	2015	2016	2017	2018	2019	2020	2021	2022	2023	2024	2025	2026
Alpha (α)	Indust	FF																ILX-LR1 ^{●}		
Alpha (α)	Cine line	FF													_{m} FX6 ^{●}					
Alpha (α)	Cine line	FF													_{m} FX3 ^{AT●}					
Alpha (α)	Cine line	FF																		_{m} FX2 ^{AT●}
Alpha (α)	Flag	FF													_{m} α1 ^{FT●}				_{m} α1 II ^{FAT●}	
Alpha (α)	Speed	FF										_{m} α9 ^{FT●}			_{m} α9 II ^{FT●}				_{m} α9 III ^{FAT●}	
Alpha (α)	Sens	FF							_{m} α7S ^{●}	_{m} α7S II ^{F●}					_{m} α7S III ^{AT●}					
Alpha (α)	Hi-Res	FF						_{m} α7R ^{●}		_{m} α7R II ^{F●}		_{m} α7R III ^{FT●}		_{m} α7R IV ^{FT●}			_{m} α7R V ^{FAT●}			
Alpha (α)	Basic	FF						_{m} α7 ^{F●}	_{m} α7 II ^{F●}				_{m} α7 III ^{FT●}			_{m} α7 IV ^{AT●}				_{m} α7 V ^{FAT●}
Alpha (α)	Compact	FF																_{m} α7CR ^{AT●}		
Alpha (α)	Compact	FF													_{m} α7C ^{AT●}			_{m} α7C II ^{AT●}		
Alpha (α)	Vlog	FF																_{m} ZV-E1 ^{AT●}		
Alpha (α)	Cine	APS-C															_{m} FX30 ^{AT●}			
Alpha (α)	Adv	APS-C			_{s} NEX-7 ^{F●}						_{m} α6500 ^{FT●}			_{m} α6600 ^{FT●}				_{m} α6700 ^{AT●}		
Alpha (α)	Mid-range	APS-C				_{m} NEX-6 ^{F●}					_{m} α6300 ^{F●}		_{m} α6400 ^{F+T●}							
Alpha (α)	Mid-range	APS-C						_{m} α6000 ^{F●}						_{m} α6100 ^{FT●}						
Alpha (α)	Vlog	APS-C														_{m} ZV-E10 ^{AT●}			_{m} ZV-E10 II ^{AT●}	
Alpha (α)	Entry-level	APS-C	NEX-5 ^{F●}	NEX-5N ^{FT●}		NEX-5R ^{F+T●}	NEX-5T ^{F+T●}		α5100 ^{F+T●}											
Alpha (α)	Entry-level	APS-C	NEX-3 ^{F●}	NEX-C3 ^{F●}		NEX-F3 ^{F+●}	NEX-3N ^{F+●}	α5000 ^{F+●}												
DSLR-style		APS-C					_{m} α3000 ^{●}		_{m} α3500 ^{●}											
SmartShot		APS-C							QX1 ^{M●}											
CineAlta	Cine line	FF										VENICE				VENICE 2				
CineAlta	Cine line	FF																BURANO		
XDCAM	Cine line	FF												_{m} FX9						
XDCAM	Docu	S35							_{m} FS7		_{m} FS7 II									
XDCAM	Mobile	S35								_{m} FS5			_{m} FS5 II							
NXCAM	Pro	S35		NEX-FS100		NEX-FS700	NEX-FS700R													
NXCAM	APS-C					NEX-EA50														
Handycam	FF					_{m} NEX-VG900														
Handycam	APS-C		_{s} NEX-VG10		_{s} NEX-VG20	_{m} NEX-VG30														
Security		FF									SNC-VB770									
Security		FF									UMC-S3C									
Family	Level	Format																		
Family	Level	Format	'10	2011		2012	2013	2014	2015	2016	2017	2018	2019	2020	2021	2022	2023	2024	2025	2026
