= Sony E-mount =

Lens mount designed by Sony for their camcorders and mirrorless cameras

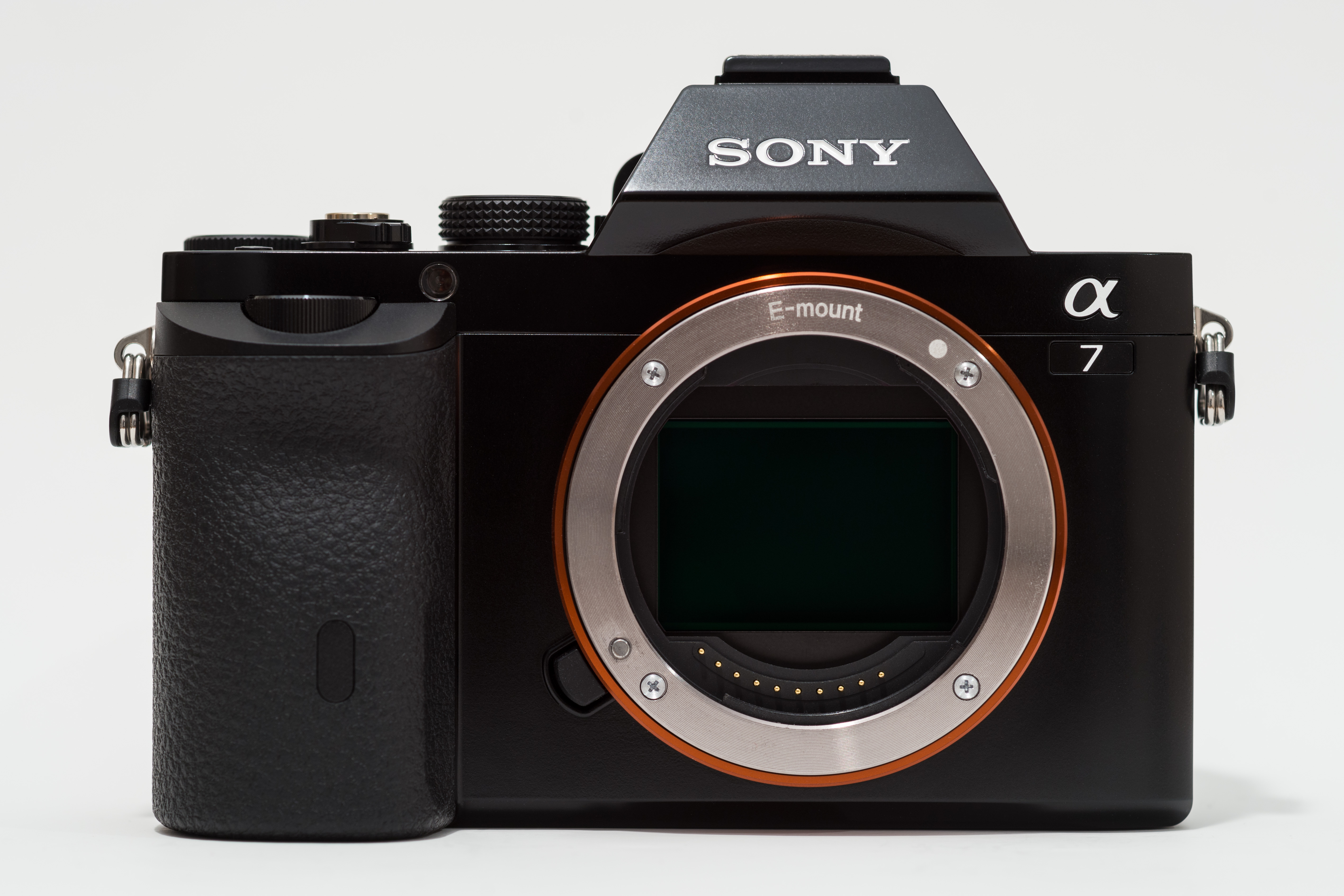
- Sony α7 E-mount obscuring the sensor
- Type: Bayonet
- Inner diameter: 46.1 mm
- Flange: 18 mm
- Introduced: 2011

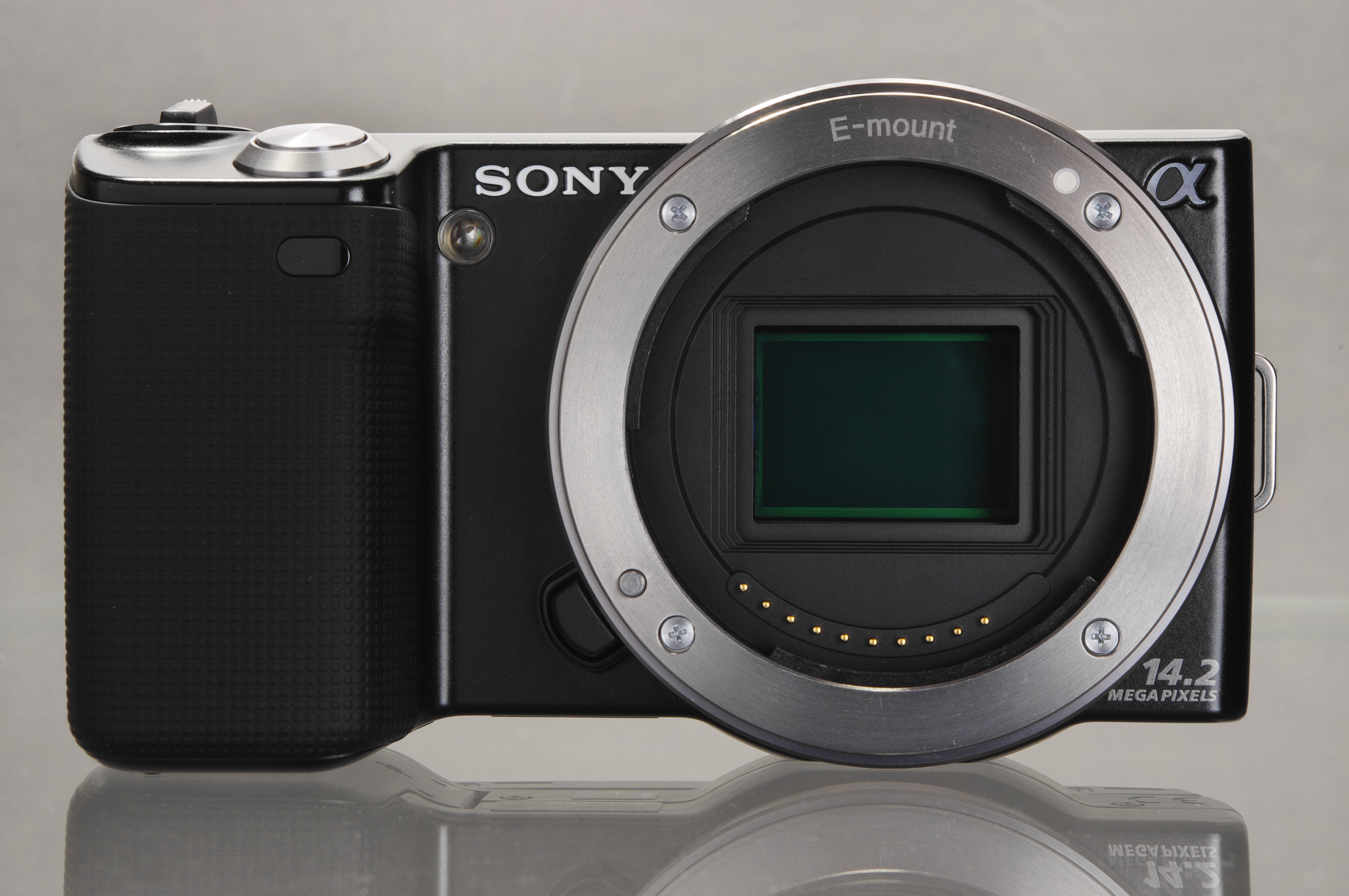
Sony NEX-5 E-mount

The E-mount is a lens mount designed by Sony for their NEX ("New E-mount eXperience") and ILCE series of camcorders and mirrorless cameras. The E-mount supplements Sony's α mount, allowing the company to develop more compact imaging devices while maintaining vignetting with 35mm sensors. E-mount achieves this by:

- Minimising mechanical complexity, removing mechanical aperture and focus drive.
- Shortening the flange focal distance to 18 mm compared with earlier offerings from Sony which used 44.5 mm.
- Reducing the radius of the flange.
- Relying on software to correct vignetting

The short flange focal distance prohibits the use of an optical viewfinder, as a mirror box mechanism cannot be included in this reduced distance. Therefore, all E-mount cameras use an electronic viewfinder.

== History ==
Initially, E-mount was implemented on the Sony α NEX-3 and NEX-5 consumer-targeted devices with APS-C sized sensors. E-mount integration into Sony camcorder products was provided with the Sony Handycam NEX-VG10. On 24 August 2011, new products were announced, specifically the NEX-5N as a successor for the NEX-5, and the NEX-7 as a prosumer product, as well as the NEX-VG20 as the successor to the NEX-VG10. The Sony E-mount was brought to the 35 mm video camera market with the Sony NEX-FS100.

The first third-party camera to use the E-mount was the Hasselblad Lunar, announced at Photokina on 18 September 2012 and released in early 2013.

In September 2013, Sony announced the first model from new ILCE series, the Sony α3000. In October 2013, the first models with full-frame sensor size were released, the Sony α7 and Sony α7R. On 19 April 2017, Sony revealed their new model Model ILCE-9, the Sony α9, characterized as a professional mirrorless camera system.

In September 2017, Sony revealed its VENICE high-end digital cinema camera, which records in 6K 16-bit raw format.

== Available bodies ==
The following table is a list of Sony E-mount cameras and their specifications.

| Name | Model | Release date | Code | ID | System | Type | Format (crop f.) | Sensor | Touch to focus | Touch menus | 5 axis IBIS | Eye AF | Fastest mech. shutter speed | Max FPS Cont. Shooting Mech. shutter | Fastest elec. shutter speed | Max FPS Cont. Shooting Elec. shutter | Phase Detect AF points | Contrast AF points | Max ISO in Auto modes | Custom buttons on the body | Mem. buffer | Screen | Viewfinder | Flash | Battery | Weight | Full HD Video | 4k Video | Video duration limit | S&Q Slow and Quick video | DxOMark Low Light ISO | Charging | Hotshoe | Latest firmware | User level | Announce date | Availability |
|---|---|---|---|---|---|---|---|---|---|---|---|---|---|---|---|---|---|---|---|---|---|---|---|---|---|---|---|---|---|---|---|---|---|---|---|---|---|
| Sony NEX-3 | NEX-3 (with Eye-Fi), NEX-3C (without Eye-Fi) | 2010-06 | CX75210 | 279 | α (Alpha) | MILC | APS-C, 23.4×15.6mm (1.5×) | CMOS, Exmor, 14.2 MP | No touch to focus | No touch menus | No IBIS | No | 1/4000 s | 7 fps without AF-C, 2.3 fps with AF-C | No Silent Electronic Shutter | | 0 | 25 | | | | | | | | | | | | | | | Smart Accessory Terminal 1 | 5 | Entry level | 2010-02-21, 2010-05-11 | Discontinued |
| Sony NEX-5 | NEX-5 (with Eye-Fi), NEX-5C (without Eye-Fi) | 2010-06 | CX75110, CX75121, CX75141 | 278 | α (Alpha) | MILC | APS-C, 23.4×15.6mm (1.5×) | CMOS, Exmor, 14.2 MP | No touch to focus | No touch menus | No IBIS | No | 1/4000 s | 7 fps without AF-C, 2.3 fps with AF-C | No Silent Electronic Shutter | | 0 | 25 | 1600 ISO | No custom buttons on the body | | Tiltable 45° down and 90° up | Sony FDA-EV1S viewfinder accessory | Flash accessory | 1080 mAh NP-FW50 | 287 g | 1920 x 1080 | No 4k video | 30 min video duration limit | NO S&Q Slow and Quick video | 796 DxOMark Low Light ISO | Battery can only be charged in external charger | Smart Accessory Terminal 1 | 5 | Midrange | 2010-02-21, 2010-05-11 | Discontinued |
| Sony NEX-C3 | NEX-C3 | 2011-08 | CX75400, CX75420 | 284 | α (Alpha) | MILC | APS-C (1.5×) | CMOS, Exmor HD, 16.2 MP | No touch to focus | No touch menus | No IBIS | No | 1/4000 s | 7 fps without AF-C, 2.3 fps with AF-C | No Silent Electronic Shutter | | 0 | 25 | | | | | | | | | | | | | | | Smart Accessory Terminal 1 | 2 | Entry level | 2011-06-08 | Discontinued |
| Sony NEX-5N | NEX-5N | 2011-09 | CX75500, CX75520 | 288 | α (Alpha) | MILC | APS-C (1.5×) | CMOS, Exmor HD, 16.1 MP | Touch to focus | Yes, touch menus | No IBIS | No | 1/4000 s | 10 fps without AF-C, 3 fps with AF-C | No Silent Electronic Shutter | | 0 | 25 | 3200 ISO | No custom buttons on the body | | Tiltable 45° down and 90° up | Sony FDA-EV1S viewfinder accessory | Flash accessory | 1080 mAh NP-FW50 | 269 g | 1920 x 1080 | No 4k video | 30 min video duration limit | NO S&Q Slow and Quick video | 1079 DxOMark Low Light ISO | Battery can only be charged in external charger | Smart Accessory Terminal 2 | 1.02 | Midrange | 2011-08-24 | Discontinued |
| Sony NEX-7 | NEX-7, Hasselblad Lunar, Hasselblad Lunar Limited Edition | 2011-12 | CX75600, CX75620 | 289 | α (Alpha) | MILC | APS-C, 23.5×15.6mm (1.5×) | CMOS, Exmor HD, 24.3 MP | No touch to focus | No touch menus | No IBIS | No | 1/4000 s | 10 fps without AF-C, 3 fps with AF-C | No Silent Electronic Shutter | | 0 | 25 | | | | | | | | | | | | | | | Auto-lock Accessory Shoe (4-pin iISO) | 1.03 | Advanced Amateur | 2011-08-24 | Discontinued |
| Sony NEX-F3 | NEX-F3 | 2012-06 | CX75700 | 293 | α (Alpha) | MILC | APS-C, 23.5×15.6mm (1.5×) | CMOS, Exmor HD, 16.1 MP | No touch to focus | No touch menus | No IBIS | No | 1/4000 s | 5.5 fps without AF-C, 2.5 fps with AF-C | No Silent Electronic Shutter | | 0 | 25 | | | | | | | | | | | | | | | Smart Accessory Terminal 2 | 1.01 | Entry level | 2012-05-17 | Discontinued |
| Sony NEX-5R | NEX-5R | 2012-10 | CX75820 | 296 | α (Alpha) | MILC | APS-C (1.5×) | CMOS, Exmor HD, 16.1 MP | Touch to focus | Touch menus | No IBIS | No | 1/4000 s | 10 fps without AF-C, 3 fps with AF-C | No Silent Electronic Shutter | | 99 | 25 | | | | | | | | | | | | | | | Smart Accessory Terminal 2 | 1.03 | Midrange | 2012-08-29 | Discontinued |
| Sony NEX-6 | NEX-6 | 2012-11 | CX76060 | 295 | α (Alpha) | MILC | APS-C, 23.5×15.6mm (1.5×) | CMOS, Exmor HD, 16.1 MP | No touch to focus | No touch menus | No IBIS | No | 1/4000 s | 10 fps without AF-C, 3 fps with AF-C | No Silent Electronic Shutter | | 99 | 25 | | | | | | | | | | | | | | | Multi Interface Shoe | 1.03 | Advanced Amateur | 2012-09-12 | Discontinued |
| Sony NEX-3N | NEX-3N | 2013-03 | CX76200 | 305 | α (Alpha) | MILC | APS-C, ca. 23.5×15.6mm (1.5×) | CMOS, Exmor HD, ca. 16 MP | No touch to focus | No touch menus | No IBIS | No | 1/4000 s | 4 fps without AF-C, 2.5 fps with AF-C | No Silent Electronic Shutter | | 0 | 25 | 3200 ISO | No custom buttons | | Tiltable 90° up | None | In-body pop-up | 1080 mAh NP-FW50 | 269 g | 1920x 1080 | No 4k | 30 min video duration limit | | | Can be charged in body, or in external charger | N/A | 1.00 | Entry level | 2013-02-20 | Discontinued |
| Sony NEX-5T | NEX-5T | 2013-09 | CX76500 | 307 | α (Alpha) | MILC | APS-C (1.5×) | CMOS, Exmor HD, 16.1 MP | Touch to focus | Touch menus | No IBIS | No | 1/4000 s | 10 fps without AF-C, 3 fps with AF-C | No Silent Electronic Shutter | | 99 | 25 | | | | | | | | | | | | | | | Smart Accessory Terminal 2 | 1.01 | Midrange | 2013-08-24 | Discontinued |
| Sony α3000 | ILCE-3000 | 2013-09 | CX77100, CX77121 | 302 | α (Alpha) | MILC | APS-C, ca. 23.5×15.6mm (1.5×) | CMOS, Exmor HD, 20.1 MP | No touch to focus | No touch menus | No IBIS | No | 1/4000 s | 3.5 fps without AF-C, 2.5 fps with AF-C | No Silent Electronic Shutter | | 0 | 25 | | | | | | | | | | | | | | | Multi Interface Shoe | 1.00/1.01 | Entry level | 2013-08-27 | Discontinued |
| Sony α7 | ILCE-7 | 2013-11 | CX77800 | 306 | α (Alpha) | MILC | Full frame, 35.8×23.9mm, (1.0×) | CMOS, Exmor HD, 24.3 MP | No touch to focus | No touch menus | No IBIS | AF-S | 1/8000 s | 5 fps without live view, 2.5 fps with live view | No Silent Electronic Shutter | | 117 | 25 | | | | | | | | | | | | | | | Multi Interface Shoe | 3.20 | Semi-Professional | 2013-10-16 | Discontinued |
| Sony α7R | ILCE-7R, Hasselblad Lusso | 2013-11 | CX77900 | 311 | α (Alpha) | MILC | Full frame, 35.9×24.0mm, (1.0×) | CMOS, Exmor HD, 36.4 MP | No touch to focus | No touch menus | No IBIS | AF-S | 1/8000 s | 4 fps without AF-C, 1.5 fps with AF-C | No Silent Electronic Shutter | | 0 | 25 | | | | | | | | | | | | | | | Multi Interface Shoe | 3.20 | Semi-Professional | 2013-10-16 | Discontinued |
| Sony α5000 | ILCE-5000 | 2014-03 | CX77300, CX77361 | 313 | α (Alpha) | MILC | APS-C, ca. 23.2×15.4mm (1.5×) | CMOS, Exmor HD, 20.1 MP | No touch to focus | No touch menus | No IBIS | AF-S | 1/4000 s | 2.5 fps with live view | No Silent Electronic Shutter | | 0 | 25 | 3200 ISO | No custom buttons on the body | | Tiltable 180° up | No viewfinder | In-body pop-up | 1080 mAh NP-FW50 | 269 g | 1920 x 1080 | No 4k video | 30 min video duration limit | NO S&Q Slow and Quick video | 1089 DxOMark Low Light ISO | Battery can be charged with micro-USB cable or in external charger. Can't be charged while in use. | N/A | 1.10 | Entry level | 2014-01-07 | Discontinued |
| Sony α6000 | ILCE-6000 | 2014-04 | CX77500 | 312 | α (Alpha) | MILC | APS-C, ca. 23.5×15.6mm (1.5×) | CMOS, Exmor HD, 24.3 MP | No touch to focus | No touch menus | No IBIS | AF-S | 1/4000 s | 11 fps without live view (HI), 2.5 fps with live view (LO) | No Silent Electronic Shutter | | 179 | 25 | 3200 ISO | C1, C2, AEL, Rotary dial | | Tiltable 45° down and 90° up | 1440 k dots viewfinder | In body pop-up tiltable flash | 1020 mAh NP-FW50 | 344 g | | No 4k video | 30 min video duration limit | NO S&Q Slow and Quick video | 1347 DxOMark Low Light ISO | Battery can be charged with micro-USB cable or in external charger. Can't be charged while in use. | Multi Interface Shoe | 3.20 | Advanced Amateur | 2014-02-12 | Discontinued |
| Sony α3500 | ILCE-3500 | 2014-03 | CX77100 | 302 | α (Alpha) | MILC | APS-C, ca. 23.2×15.4mm (1.5×) | CMOS, Exmor HD, 20.1 MP | No touch to focus | No touch menus | No IBIS | No | 1/4000 s | 3.5 fps without AF-C, 2.5 fps with AF-C | No Silent Electronic Shutter | | 0 | 25 | | | | | | | | | | | | | | | Multi Interface Shoe | 1.01 | Entry level | 2014-03-21 | Discontinued |
| Sony α7S | ILCE-7S | 2014-06 | CX78500 | 318 | α (Alpha) | MILC | Full frame, 35.6×23.8mm, (1.0×) | CMOS, Exmor HD, 12.2 MP | No touch to focus | No touch menus | No IBIS | AF-S | 1/8000 s | 5 fps without AF-C or live view, 2.5 fps with AF-C and live view | 1/8000 s | 5 fps without AF-C or live view, 2.5 fps with AF-C and live view | 0 | 25 | | | | | | | | | | | | | | | Multi Interface Shoe | 3.20 | Semi-Professional | 2014-04-06 | Current |
| Sony α5100 | ILCE-5100 | 2014-09 | CX78300? | 339 | α (Alpha) | MILC | APS-C, approx. 23.5×15.6mm (1.5×) | CMOS, Exmor HD, 24.3 MP | Touch to focus | No touch menus | No IBIS | AF-S | 1/4000 s | 6 fps without live view (HI), 3 fps with live view (LO) | No Silent Electronic Shutter | | 179 | 25 | 3200 ISO | No custom buttons on the body | | Tiltable 180° up | No viewfinder | In body pop-up tiltable flash | 1020 mAh NP-FW50 | 283 g | | No 4k video | 30 min video duration limit | NO S&Q Slow and Quick video | 1347 DxOMark Low Light ISO | | N/A | 3.10 | Entry level | 2014-08-18 | Discontinued |
| Sony α7 II | ILCE-7M2 | 2015-01 | | 340 | α (Alpha) | MILC | Full frame, 35.8×23.9mm, (1.0×) | CMOS, Exmor HD, 24.3 MP | No touch to focus | No touch menus | 5 axis IBIS | AF-S | 1/8000 s | 5 fps without live view (HI), 2.5 fps with live view (LO) | No Silent Electronic Shutter | | 117 | 25 | | | | | | | | | | | | | | | Multi Interface Shoe | 4.00 | Semi-Professional | 2014-11-20 | Discontinued |
| Sony α7R II | ILCE-7RM2 | 2015-06 | | 347 | α (Alpha) | MILC | Full frame, 35.8×23.9mm, (1.0×) | BSI CMOS, Exmor R HD, 42.4 MP | No touch to focus | No touch menus | 5 axis IBIS | AF-C | 1/8000 s | 5 fps without live view (HI), 2.5 fps with live view (LO) | 1/8000 s | 5 fps without live view (HI), 2.5 fps with live view (LO) | 399 | 25 | | | | | | | | | | | | | | | Multi Interface Shoe | 4.00 | Semi-Professional | 2015-06-10 | Discontinued |
| Sony α7S II | ILCE-7SM2 | 2015-11 | | 350 | α (Alpha) | MILC | Full frame, 35.6×23.8mm, (1.0×) | CMOS, Exmor HD, 12.2 MP | No touch to focus | No touch menus | 5 axis IBIS | AF-S | 1/8000 s | 5 fps without AF-C or live view, 2.5 fps with AF-C and live view | 1/8000 s | 5 fps without AF-C or live view, 2.5 fps with AF-C and live view | 0 | 169 | | | | | | | | | | | | | | | Multi Interface Shoe | 3.00 | Semi-Professional | 2015-09-11 | Current |
| Sony α7S III | ILCE-7SM3 | 2020-09 | | | α (Alpha) | MILC | Full frame, 35.6×23.8mm, (1.0×) | CMOS, Exmor HD, 12.1 MP | | | 5 axis IBIS | | 1/8000 s | | | | 759 | 425 | | | | | | | | 614g | | | | | | | Multi Interface Shoe | 2.00 | Semi-Professional | 2020-07-28 | Current |
| Sony α6300 | ILCE-6300 | 2016-03 | | 357 | α (Alpha) | MILC | APS-C, ca. 23.5×15.6mm (1.5×) | CMOS, Exmor, 24.2 MP | No touch to focus | No touch menus | No IBIS | AF-C | 1/4000 s | 11 fps without live view (HI+), 8 fps with live view (HI) | 1/4000 s electronic shutter | 2.5 fps in silent mode (LO) | 425 | 169 | | C1, C2, AEL, AF/MF, Rotary dial | | Tiltable 45° down and 90° up | 2359 k dots, 100 Hz viewfinder | In body pop-up tiltable flash | 1020 mAh NP-FW50 | 403 g | | 4k video | 30 min video duration limit | 1 fps to 120 fps S&Q Slow and Quick video | 1437 DxOMark Low Light ISO | Battery can be charged with micro-USB cable or in external charger. Can't be charged while in use. | Multi Interface Shoe | 2.01 | Advanced Amateur | 2016-02-03 | Discontinued |
| Sony α6500 | ILCE-6500 | 2016-12 | | ? | α (Alpha) | MILC | APS-C, ca. 23.5×15.6mm (1.5×) | CMOS, Exmor, 24.2 MP | Touch to focus | No touch menus | 5 axis IBIS | AF-C | 1/4000 s | 11 fps without live view (HI+), 8 fps with live view (HI) | 1/4000 s electronic shutter | 2.5 fps in silent mode (LO) | 425 | 169 | 6400 ISO | C1, C2, C3, AEL, AF/MF, Rotary dial | | Tiltable 45° down and 90° up | 2359 k dots, 100 Hz viewfinder | In body pop-up tiltable flash | 1020 mAh NP-FW50 | 453 g | | 4k video | 30 min video duration limit | 1 fps to 120 fps S&Q Slow and Quick video | 1405 DxOMark Low Light ISO | CAN be charged while in use. Battery can be charged with micro-USB cable or in external charger. | Multi Interface Shoe | 1.05 | Advanced Amateur | 2016-10-06 | Discontinued |
| Sony α9 | ILCE-9 | 2017-05 | | ? | α (Alpha) | MILC | Full frame, 35.9×24.0mm, (1.0×) | CMOS, Exmor HD, 24.2 MP | Touch to focus | No touch menus | 5 axis IBIS | Real-time | 1/8000 s | 5 fps (HI+) | 1/32,768 electronic shutter only works in M and S modes | 20 fps (HI+), 10 fps (HI) in silent mode | 693 | 425 | | C1, C2, C3, C4, AEL, AF-On, 2xRotary dial, Exposure compensation | | Tiltable 45° down and 90° up | 3686 k dots, 100 Hz viewfinder | NO in body pop-up tiltable flash | 2280 mAh NP-FZ100 | 673 g | | 4k video | 30 min video duration limit | 1 fps to 120 fps S&Q Slow and Quick video | 3517 DxOMark Low Light ISO | | Multi Interface Shoe | 4.10 | Professional | 2017-04-19 | Current |
| Sony α7R III | ILCE-7RM3 | 2017-11 | | ? | α (Alpha) | MILC | Full frame, 35.8×23.9mm, (1.0×) | BSI CMOS, Exmor R HD, 42.4 MP | Touch to focus | No touch menus | 5 axis IBIS | Real-time | 1/8000 s | 10 fps without live view (HI+), 8 fps with live view (HI) | 1/8000 s | 10 fps without live view (HI+), 8 fps with live view (HI) | 399 | 425 | | C1, C2, C3, C4, AEL, AF-On, 2xRotary dial, Exposure compensation | | Tiltable 45° down and 90° up | 2359 k dots, 100 Hz viewfinder | NO in body pop-up tiltable flash | 2280 mAh NP-FZ100 | | | | 30 min video duration limit | 1 fps to 120 fps S&Q Slow and Quick video | | | Multi Interface Shoe | 2.10 | Professional | 2017-10-25 | Current |
| Sony α7 III | ILCE-7M3 | 2018-04 | | ? | α (Alpha) | MILC | Full frame, 35.8×23.9mm, (1.0×) | BSI CMOS, Exmor R HD, 24.2 MP | Touch to focus | No touch menus | 5 axis IBIS | Real-time | 1/8000 s | 10 fps without live view (HI+), 8 fps with live view (HI) | 1/8000 s | 10 fps without live view (HI+), 8 fps with live view (HI) | 693 | 425 | | C1, C2, C3, C4, AEL, AF-On, 2xRotary dial, Exposure compensation | | Tiltable 45° down and 90° up | 2359 k dots, 100 Hz viewfinder | NO in body pop-up tiltable flash | 2280 mAh NP-FZ100 | 650 g | | 4k video | 30 min video duration limit | 1 fps to 120 fps S&Q Slow and Quick video | 3730 DxOMark Low Light ISO | | Multi Interface Shoe | 2.10 | Semi-Professional | 2018-02-27 | Current |
| Sony α6400 | ILCE-6400 | 2019-04 | | ? | α (Alpha) | MILC | APS-C, ca. 23.5×15.6mm (1.5×) | CMOS, Exmor, 24.2 MP | Touch to focus | No touch menus | No IBIS | Real-time | 1/4000 s | 11 fps without live view (HI+), 8 fps with live view (HI) | 1/4000 s electronic shutter | 2.5 fps in silent mode (LO) | 425 | 425 | | C1, C2, AEL, Rotary dial | | Tiltable 45° down and 180° up | 2359 k dots, 100 Hz viewfinder | In body pop-up tiltable flash | 1020 mAh NP-FW50 | 404 g | | 4k video | unlimited video duration | 1 fps to 120 fps S&Q Slow and Quick video | 1431 DxOMark Low Light ISO | | Multi Interface Shoe | ? | Advanced Amateur | 2019-01-15 | Current |
| Sony α7R IV | ILCE-7RM4 | 2019-09 | | ? | α (Alpha) | MILC | Full frame, 35.7×23.8mm (1.0×) | BSI CMOS, Exmor R HD, 61 MP | Touch to focus | No touch menus | 5 axis IBIS | Real-time | 1/8000 s | 10 fps | 1/8000 s | 10 fps | 567 | 425 | 32.000 ISO | C1, C2, C3, C4, AEL, AF-On, 2 rotary dials, exposure compensation | | Tiltable 45° down and 90° up | 5.760 k dots, 100–120 Hz viewfinder | NO in body pop-up tiltable flash | 2280 mAh NP-FZ100 | 665 g | | 4k video | unlimited video duration | 1 fps to 120 fps S&Q Slow and Quick video | 3344 DxOMark Low Light ISO | Can be charged while in use. Battery can be charged with micro-USB cable, USB-C-cable, or in external charger. | Multi Interface Shoe | 1.20 | Professional | 2019-07-16 | Discontinued |
| Sony α6600 | ILCE-6600 | 2019-10 | | | α (Alpha) | MILC | APS-C, ca. 23.5×15.6mm (1.5×) | CMOS, Exmor, 24.2 MP | Touch to focus | No touch menus | 5 axis IBIS | Real-time | 1/4000 s | 11 fps without live view (HI+), 8 fps with live view (HI) | 1/4000 s electronic shutter | 2.5 fps in silent mode (LO) | 425 | 425 | | C1, C2, C3, C4, AEL, AF/MF, Rotary dial | | Tiltable 45° down and 180° up | 2359 k dots, 100 Hz viewfinder | NO in body pop-up tiltable flash | 2280 mAh NP-FZ100 | 503 g | | 4k video | unlimited video duration | 1 fps to 120 fps S&Q Slow and Quick video | | | Multi Interface Shoe | 2.00 | Advanced Amateur | 2019-08-28 | Current |
| Sony α6100 | ILCE-6100 | 2019-10 | | | α (Alpha) | MILC | APS-C, ca. 23.5×15.6mm (1.5×) | CMOS, Exmor, 24.2 MP | Touch to focus | No touch menus | No IBIS | Real-time | 1/4000 s | 11 fps without live view (HI+), 8 fps with live view (HI) | 1/4000 s electronic shutter | 2.5 fps in silent mode (LO) | 425 | 425 | | C1, C2, AEL, Rotary dial | | Tiltable 45° down and 180° up | 1440 k dots viewfinder | In body pop-up tiltable flash | 1020 mAh NP-FW50 | 396 g | | 4k video | unlimited video duration | 1 fps to 120 fps S&Q Slow and Quick video | | | Multi Interface Shoe | | Advanced Amateur | 2019-08-28 | Discontinued |
| Sony α9 II | ILCE-9M2 | 2019-10 | | | α (Alpha) | MILC | Full frame, 35.6×23.8mm (1.0×) | BSI Stacked CMOS, Exmor RS, 24.2 MP | Touch to focus | No touch menus | 5 axis IBIS | Real-time | 1/8000 s | Hi: max. 10fps | 1/32000 | Hi: max. 20 fps | 693 | 425 | | | | | 3686 k dots, STD 60fps / HI 120fps | NO in body pop-up tiltable flash | 2280 mAh NP-FZ100 | 678 g | | 4k video | unlimited video duration | | | | Multi Interface Shoe | | Professional | 2019-10-03 | Current |
| Sony α7C | ILCE-7C | 2020-10 | | | α (Alpha) | MILC | 35mm full frame (35.6 x 23.8mm) | CMOS, Exmor R, 24.2 MP | | | 5 axis IBIS | | | | 1/4000 s electronic shutter | | 693 | 425 | | | | Articulating screen | 2,359,296 dots viewfinder | | | 509g | | 4k video | unlimited video duration | | | | Multi Interface Shoe | | Advanced Amateur | 2020-09-14 | Current |
| Sony α1 | ILCE-1 | 2021-01 | | | α (Alpha) | MILC | 35 mm full frame (35.9 x 23.9 mm) | BSI Stacked CMOS, Exmor RS, 50.1 MP | Touch to focus | Touch menus | 5 axis IBIS | Real-time | 1/8000 s | Hi: max. 30fps | 1/8000 s mechanical shutter; 1/32000 s electronic shutter | | 759 | 425 | | C1, C2, C3, C4, AEL, AF/MF, Rotary dial | | Tiltable 41° down and 107° up | 9.4M dots viewfinder | No flash | 2280 mAh NP-FZ100 | 737g | 1920 x 1080 | 8k video | unlimited video duration | | | Can be charged while in use. Battery can be charged with micro-USB cable, USB-C-cable, or in external charger. | Multi Interface Shoe | | Flagship | 2021-1-27 | Current |
| Sony α7 IV | ILCE-7M4 | 2021-10 | | | α (Alpha) | MILC | 35 mm full frame (35.9 x 23.9 mm) | CMOS, Exmor R, 34.1 MP | Touch to focus | Touch menus | 5 axis IBIS | Real-time | 1/8000 s | Hi: max. 10fps | 1/8000 s electronic shutter | | 759 | 425 | | C1, C2, C3, C4, AEL, AF/MF, Rotary dial | | Articulating screen | 3,686,400 dots viewfinder | No flash | 2280 mAh NP-FZ100 | 665g | 1920 x 1080 | 4k video | unlimited video duration | | | Can be charged while in use. Battery can be charged with micro-USB cable, USB-C-cable, or in external charger. | Multi Interface Shoe | | Semi-Professional | 2021-10-21 | Current |
| Sony α7R V | ILCE-7RM5 | 2022-12 | | | a (Alpha) | MILC | 35 mm full frame (35.7 x 23.8 mm) | Exmor R Cmos 62.5 MP | Touch to focus | Touch menus | 5 axis IBIS | Real-time | 1/8000 s | Hi: max. 10fps | 1/8000 s electronic shutter | | 759 | 425 | | | | | | No in body pop-up flash. | | | 3840 x 2860 | 4k video | unlimited video duration | | | Can be charged while in use. Battery can be charged with micro-USB cable, USB-C-cable,or in external charger. | Multi Interface Shoe | | Semi-Professional | 2022-10-26 | Current |
| Sony α QX1 | ILCE-QX1 | 2014-10 | | 346 | α (Alpha) QX-series | MILC (lens-type, smartphone-mounted) | APS-C, approx. 23.2×15.4mm (1.5×) | CMOS, 20.1 MP | | | | | | | | | 0 | 25 | | | | | | | | | | | | | | | None | Unknown | Advanced Amateur | 2014-09-03 | Discontinued |
| Sony NEX-VG10 | NEX-VG10E, NEX-VG10A, NEX-VG10J | 2010-09 | CX36000, CX36001 | | Handycam | Camcorder | APS-C, 23.4×15.6mm (1.5×) | CMOS, Exmor HD, 14.2 MP | | | | | | | | | 0 | 25 | | | | | | | | | | | | | | | Auto-lock Accessory Shoe (4-pin iISO) | 3 | Advanced Amateur | 2010-05-11, 2010-07-14 | Discontinued |
| Sony NEX-VG20 | NEX-VG20E, NEX-VG20A, NEX-VG20J | 2011-11 | CX36100 | 290 | Handycam | Camcorder | APS-C, 23.4×15.6mm (1.5×) | CMOS, Exmor HD, 16.1 MP | | | | | | | | | 0 | 25 | | | | | | | | | | | | | | | Auto-lock Accessory Shoe (4-pin iISO) | 1 | Advanced Amateur | 2011-08-24 | Discontinued |
| Sony NEX-VG30 | NEX-VG30E | 2012-11 | CX43500? | 300 | Handycam | Camcorder | APS-C, 23.4×15.6mm (1.5×) | CMOS, Exmor HD, 16.1 MP | | | | | | | | | 0 | 25 | | | | | | | | | | | | | | | Multi Interface Shoe + ISO-518 (0-pin) | 1 | Advanced Amateur | 2012-09-12 | Discontinued |
| Sony NEX-VG900 | NEX-VG900E | 2012-11 | CX45600 | 299 | Handycam | Camcorder | Full frame, 35.8×23.9mm, (1.0×) | CMOS, Exmor HD, 24.3 MP | | | | | | | | | 0 | 25 | | | | | | | | | | | | | | | Multi Interface Shoe | 1 | Semi-Professional | 2012-09-12 | Discontinued |
| Sony NEX-FS100 | NEX-FS100E, NEX-FS100U, NEX-FS100J | 2011-07 | CX94500, CX94600 | | NXCAM | Camcorder | Super-35mm, 23.6×13.3mm (1.6×) | CMOS, Exmor HD, 3.5 MP | | | | | | | | | 0 | 25 | | | | | | | | | | | | | | | | 2 | Semi-Professional | 2010-11-17, 2011-03-23 | Discontinued |
| Sony NEX-FS700 | NEX-FS700E, NEX-FS700U, NEX-FS700J, NEX-FS700R | 2012-06 | CX96000, CX96100 | | NXCAM | Camcorder | Super-35mm, 23.6×13.3mm, (1.6×) | CMOS, Exmor 4K, 11.6 MP | | | | | | | | | | | | | | | | | | | | | | | | | | 2 (non-R w/o 4K), 3 (NEX-FS700R w/ 4K) | Professional | 2012-04-02 | Discontinued |
| Sony NEX-EA50 | NEX-EA50E, NEX-EA50U | 2012-11 | CX95100, CX95300 | | NXCAM | Camcorder | APS-C, 23.5×15.6 mm (1.5×) | CMOS, Exmor HD, 16.1 MP | | | | | | | | | | | | | | | | | | | | | | | | | ISO-518 (2-pin) | 2 | Semi-Professional | 2012-08-17 | Discontinued |
| Sony PXW-FS7 | PXW-FS7 | 2014-11 | | | XDCAM | Camcorder | Super-35mm, 23.6×13.3mm, (1.6×) | CMOS, Exmor 4K, 11.6 MP | | | | | | | | | | | | | | | | | | | | | | | | | ISO-518 cold shoe | | Professional | 2014-09-12 | Discontinued |
| Sony PXW-FS5 | PXW-FS5 | 2015-11 | | | XDCAM | Camcorder | Super-35mm, 23.6×13.3mm, (1.6×) | CMOS, Exmor 4K, 11.6 MP | | | | | | | | | | | | | | | | | | | | | | | | | ISO-518 cold shoe | | Professional | | Discontinued |
| Sony PXW-FS7 II | PXW-FS7 | 2017-01 | | | XDCAM | Camcorder | Super-35mm, 23.6×13.3mm, (1.6×) | CMOS, Exmor 4K, 11.6 MP | | | | | | | | | | | | | | | | | | | | | | | | | ISO-518 cold shoe | | Professional | | Current |
| Sony VENICE | VENICE | 2018-02 | | | CineAlta | Digital Cinema Camera | Full frame, 36.2×24.1mm, (1.0×) | CMOS, 6K, 24.4 MP | | | | | | | | | | | | | | | | | | | | | | | | | | 4.0 | Professional | | Current |
| Sony PXW-FS5 II | PXW-FS5 | 2018-06 | | | XDCAM | Camcorder | Super-35mm, 23.6×13.3mm, (1.6×) | CMOS, Exmor 4K, 11.6 MP | | | | | | | | | | | | | | | | | | | | | | | | | | | Professional | | Current |
| Sony PXW-FX9 | PXW-FX9 | 2019-12 | | | XDCAM | Camcorder | Full frame, 36.2×24.1mm, (1.0×) | CMOS, 6K, 24.4 MP | | | | | | | | | | | | | | | | | | | | | | | | | | | Professional | | Current |
| Sony FX6 | ILME-FX6V / ILME-FX6VK | 2020-11 | | | α (Alpha) | Camcorder | Full frame, 35.6×23.8mm, (1.0×) | CMOS, EXMOR R, 12.9 MP | | | | | | | | | | | | | | | | | | | | | | | | | | | Professional | | Current |
| Sony FX3 | ILME-FX3 | 2021-03 | | | α (Alpha) | MILC | Full frame, 35.6×23.8mm, (1.0×) | CMOS, EXMOR R, 12.1 MP | | | | | | | | | 759 (stills) 627 (movie) | | | | | | | | | | | | | | | | | | Professional | | Current |
| Sony ZV-E10 | | 2021-07 | | | | | APS-C, 23.4×15.6mm (1.5×) | CMOS, Exmor R, 24.2 MP | | | | | | | | | 425 | 425 | | | | | | | | | | | | | | | | | | | |
| Sony ZV-E1 | | 2023-05 | | | | | Full frame, 35.6×23.8mm, (1.0×) | CMOS, Exmor R, 12.1 MP | | | | | | | | | 759 (stills) 627 (movie) | | | | | | | | | | | | | | | | | | | | |
| Sony α6700 | ILCE-6700 | 2023-08 | | | α (Alpha) | MILC | APS-C, 23.3×15.5 mm (1.5×) | CMOS, Exmor R, 26.0 MP | | | 5 axis IBIS | Real-time | 1/4000 s mechanical shutter | Hi+: max. 11fps | 1/8000 s electronic shutter | | 759 (stills) 495 (movie) | 425 | 32,000 ISO | | | Articulating screen | 2,359,296 dots viewfinder | | 2280 mAh NP-FZ100 | 409 g | | 4k video | Unlimited video duration | | | | Multi Interface Shoe | | Advanced Amateur | 2023-07-12 | Current |
| Sony α7C II | ILCE-7CM2 | 2023-09 | | | α (Alpha) | MILC | 35mm full frame (35.9 x 23.9mm) | CMOS, Exmor R, 33.0 MP | | | 5 axis IBIS | Real-time | 1/4000 s electronic shutter | Hi: max. 10fps | 1/8000 s electronic shutter | | 759 | 425 | 12,800 ISO | | | Articulating screen | 2,359,296 dots viewfinder | | 2280 mAh NP-FZ100 | 429 g | | 4k video | Unlimited video duration | | | | Multi Interface Shoe | | Advanced Amateur | 2023-08-29 | Current |
| Sony α7CR | ILCE-7CR | 2023-09 | | | α (Alpha) | MILC | 35mm full frame (35.7 x 23.8 mm) | CMOS, Exmor R, 62.5 MP | | | 5 axis IBIS | Real-time | 1/4000 s electronic shutter | Hi: max. 8fps | 1/8000 s electronic shutter | | 693 | | 32,000 ISO | | | Articulating screen | 2,359,296 dots viewfinder | | 2280 mAh NP-FZ100 | 430 g | | 4k video | Unlimited video duration | | | | Multi Interface Shoe | | Advanced Amateur | 2023-08-29 | Current |
| Sony α1 II | ILCE-1M2 | 2024-12 | | | α (Alpha) | MILC | 35mm full frame (35.7 x 23.8 mm) | BSI Stacked CMOS, Exmor RS, 50.1 MP | Touch to focus | Touch menus | 5 axis IBIS | Real-time | 1/8000 s | Hi: max. 30fps | 1/8000 s mechanical shutter; 1/32000 s electronic shutter | | 759 | | 32,000 ISO | C1, C2, C3, C4, C5, AEL, AF/MF, Rotary dial | | Articulating screen | 9.4M dots viewfinder | | 2280 mAh NP-FZ100 | 746 g | | 8k video | Unlimited video duration | 4K 120fps, 1080p 240fps | | | Multi Interface Shoe | | Flagship | 2024-11-19 | Current |
| Sony α9 III | ILCE-9M3 | 2024-02 | | | α (Alpha) | MILC | 35mm full frame (35.7 x 23.8 mm) | CMOS, Exmor RS, 24.60 MP with global shutter | Touch to focus | Touch menus | 5 axis IBIS | Real-time | | | 1/ 80000 | 120 fps | 759 | | 25,600 ISO | C1, C2, C3, C4, C5, AEL, AF/MF, Rotary dial | 236 | 2 095 104 dots tilt-and-articulating LCD | 9 437 184 dots EVF | | 2280 mAh NP-FZ100 | 702 g | | 4K video | Unlimited video duration | 4K 120fps, 1080p 120fps | | | Multi interface shoe | | Flagship | | Current |
| Sony α7 V | ILCE-7M4 | 2025-12 | | | α (Alpha) | MILC | 35mm full frame (35.7 x 23.8 mm) | partially stacked Exmor RS™ CMOS sensor, 33.0 MP | Touch to focus | Touch menus | 5-axis IBIS | Real-time | | | | | 759 | 425 | | | | | | | | | | | | | | | | | | 2025-12-2 | |
| Name | Model | Release date | Code | ID | System | Type | Format (crop f.) | Sensor | Touch to focus | Touch menus | 5 axis IBIS | Eye AF | Fastest mech. shutter speed | Max FPS Cont. Shooting Mech. shutter | Fastest elec. shutter speed | Max FPS Cont. Shooting Elec. shutter | Phase Detect AF points | Contrast AF points | Max ISO in Auto modes | Custom buttons on the body | Mem. buffer | Screen | Viewfinder | Flash | Battery | Weight | Full HD Video | 4k Video | Video duration limit | S&Q Slow and Quick video | DxOMark Low Light ISO | Charging | Hotshoe | Latest firmware | User level | Announce date | Availability |

== Third-party lens manufacturers ==
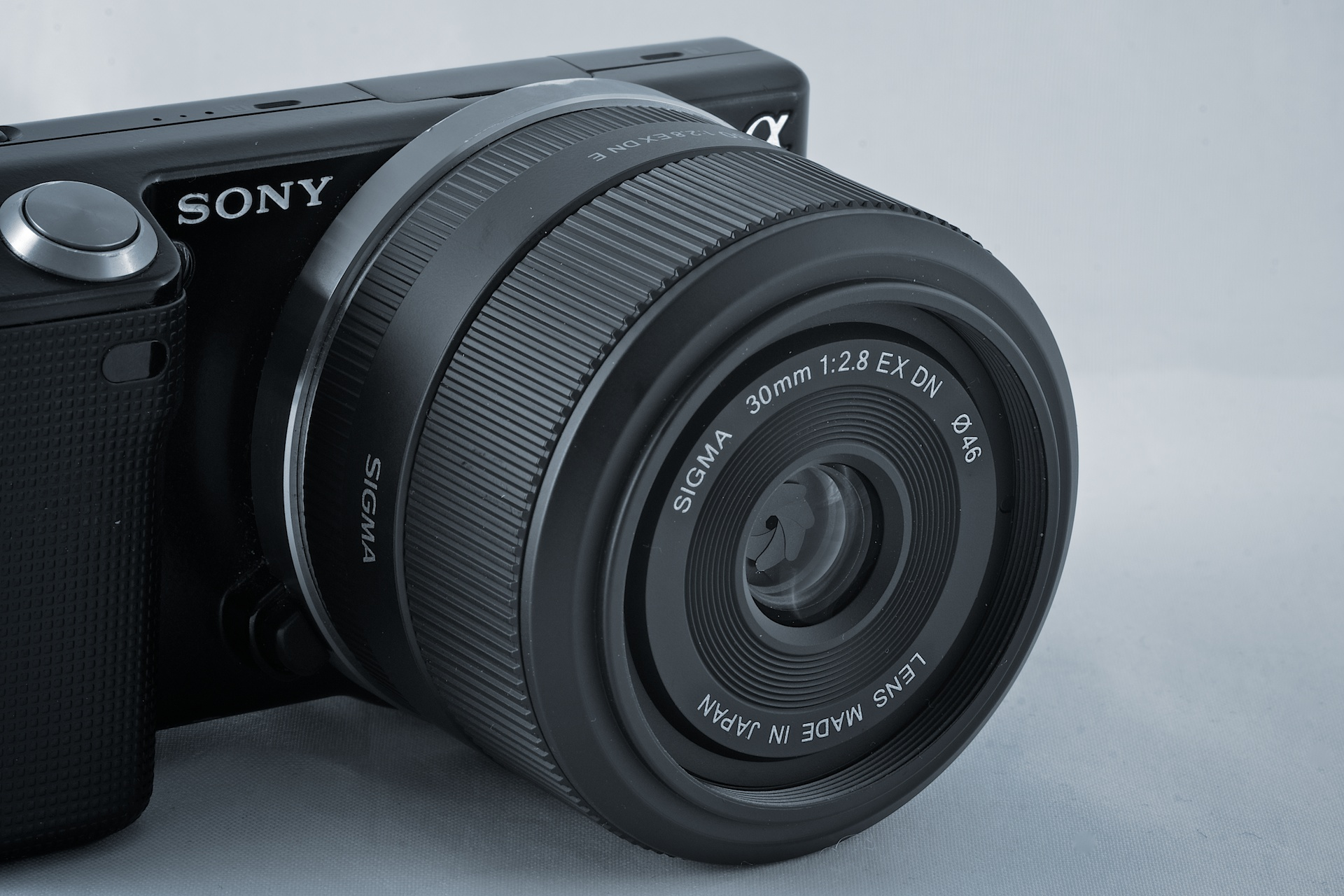
Sony NEX-5 with Sigma 30mm F2.8 EX DN lens.

On 8 February 2011, Sony announced the release of the specifications for the E-mount lens system, allowing for third-party lens makers to create lenses for NEX cameras without having to pay royalties. The mount specifications have been released to registered parties since April 2011. Getting a license for the specifications requires approval by Sony and the signing of a non-disclosure agreement.

The construction of full-frame manual focus prime lenses without any electronics is relatively easier and less costly than the construction of electronic full-frame autofocus lenses of any kind. This has encouraged lesser known lens companies to construct full-frame prime lenses with an E-mount. Numerous affordable sharp full-format manual prime lenses with big apertures are available with an E-mount.

=== List of manufacturers of third-party lenses ===
- Yongnuo
- 7Artisans
- Anhui ChangGeng Optical Technology Company
- AstrHori
- Carl Zeiss AG
- Cosina Co., Ltd.
- Handevision
- Irix Lens
- Samyang Optics / Rokinon
- Sigma Corporation
- SIRUI Lens /Astra FF Anamorphic/Aurora FF AF/Nightwalker MF CINE/Sniper AF APS-C/Saturn FF Anamorphic/Venus FF Anamorphic/Jupiter Macro Cine
- Shenyang Zhongyi Optical and Electronic Company (ZY Optics)
- Shenzhen Neewer
- SLR Magic
- Tamron Co., Ltd.
- Tokina
- TTArtisan
- Venus Optics
- Viltrox
- Voigtländer
- Yasuhara
- Zunow

== Adapting lenses to Sony E-mount ==
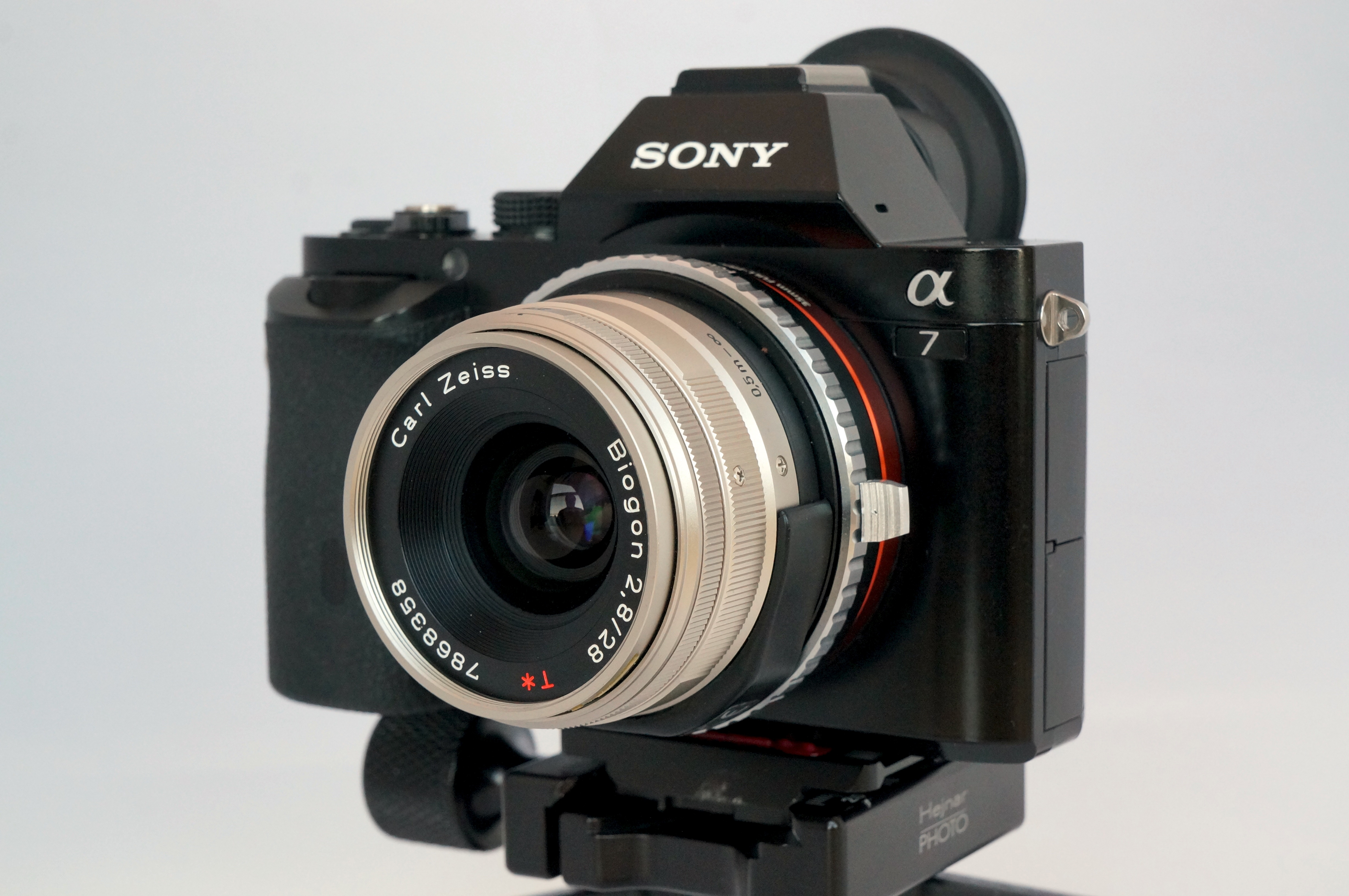
Sony α7 with an adapted Carl Zeiss Biogon 28mm F2.8 lens for Contax G mount.

Due to the short flange focal distance of the Sony E-mount, many lenses can be adapted to be used on the Sony E-mount, although a crop factor will have to be taken into account for all cameras with APS-C or Super-35mm sensor format. Additionally, with the introduction of in-camera image stabilization to Sony's newer mirrorless cameras, any adapted lens (regardless of age, brand, or lens mount) can be image stabilized.

Nearly all manual lenses can be attached with simple ring-like adapters to Sony's mirrorless cameras, such as for Canon FD, Minolta MC/MD, Leica M, and many others. Manual focus lenses that transmit Exif data will require an adapter with electronic contacts, which are generally more expensive to produce.

Adapting autofocus lenses to Sony's older E-mount cameras (such as the Sony α6000 and α7) can often be ineffective due to the inability of the camera body to effectively lock-on to a subject, resulting in either hunting or missed focus. This has largely been remedied in recent years with improved lens adapter performance, as well as the introduction of faster, more accurate autofocusing systems to Sony's more recent cameras (such as the Sony α6500 and Sony α9).

=== Sony LA-EA adapters ===
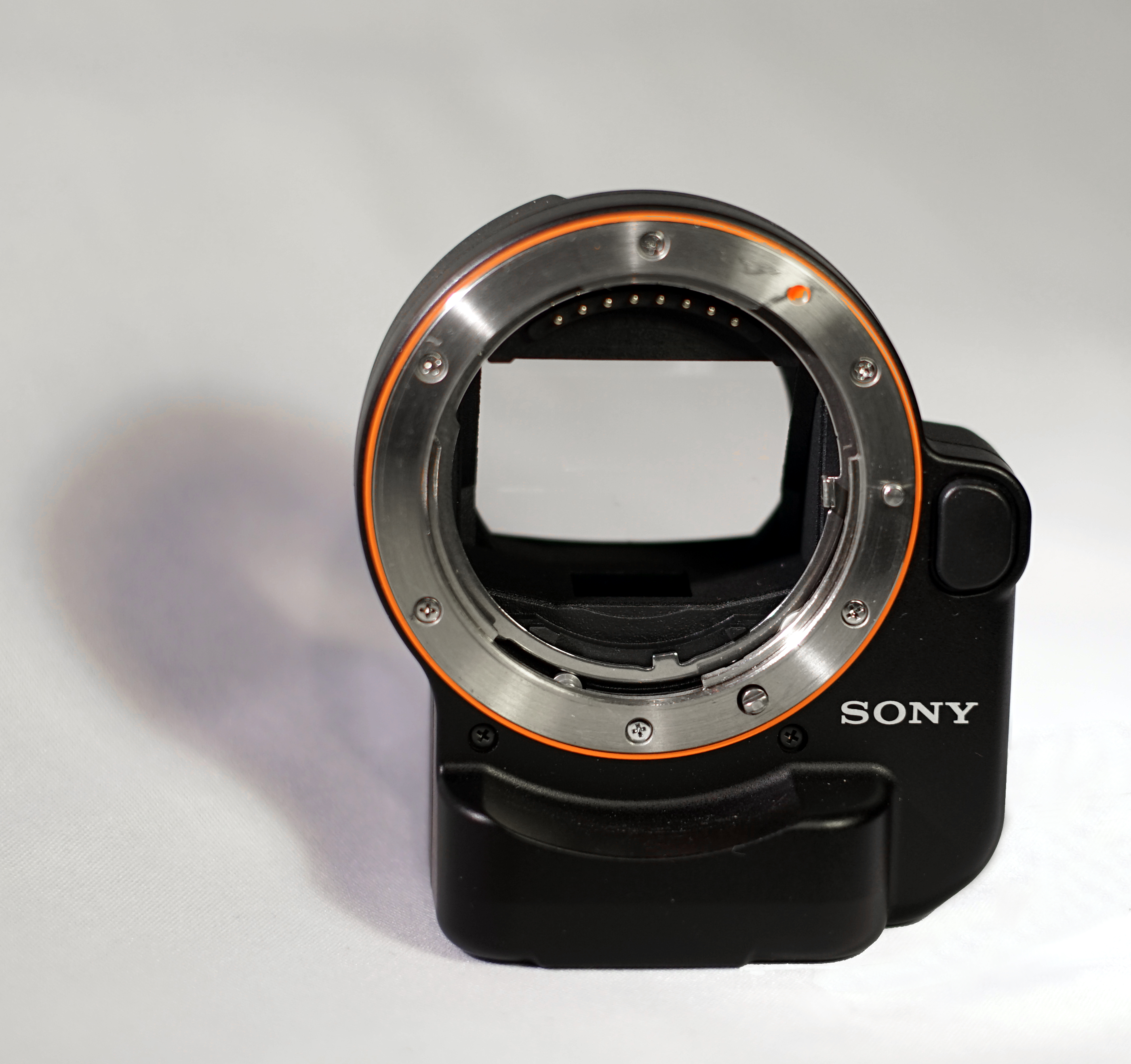
The Sony LA-EA4 adapter

Most A-mount lenses can be used via the Sony LA-EA1, LA-EA2, LA-EA3, LA-EA4, or LA-EA5 mount adapters, which provide electronic contacts and mechanical aperture control. They allow the camera body to control the aperture of the lens and provide automatic exposure and Exif data support.

- LA-EA1: APS-C format only; originally only an autoexposure adapter, but a firmware update allows it to autofocus lenses with AF motors (SSM and SAM); most screw driven lenses can be used with manual focus
- LA-EA2: APS-C format only; supports phase-detection autofocus with most A-mount lenses. the translucent-mirror directs 30% of the light to the dedicated AF sensor.
- LA-EA3: full-frame format compatible; autofocuses lenses with AF motors (SSM and SAM); most screw driven lenses can be used with manual focus
- LA-EA4: full-frame format compatible; supports phase-detection autofocus with most A-mount lenses. the translucent-mirror directs 30% of the light to the dedicated AF sensor.
- LA-EA5: full-frame format compatible; autofocuses most A-mount lenses; screw driven lenses only with newer camera bodies

Non Alpha mount Minolta lenses will not mount on these adapters. Alpha mount Power Zoom/Xi lenses are also not supported. The LA-EA2 and LA-EA4 adapters have fifteen phase-detect AF points, the center three points are cross type. Its tripod mount isn't detachable. During movie mode, the adapter doesn't permit the change of aperture. The translucent-mirror SLT design, which requires a pellicle mirror in the light path, causes 1/3 of the light to be reflected to the autofocus sensor. The 1/3 light fall-off equals 1/2 stop and may decrease the image quality accordingly when available light is a limiting factor.

Techart offers a unique autofocusing adapter, having a motor that moves the adapter flange along optical axis. It has Leica M-mount on the lens side, but via stacking additional adapter almost any SLR lens can be mounted.

=== Sony LA-EB adapters ===
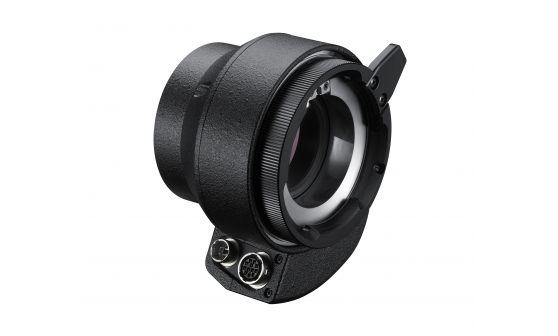
Sony LA-EB1 Adapter

Released at the end of 2019, this lens adapter allows for the mounting of a B4-mount-lens with electronic connection.

- LA-EB1: Super 16 format only

=== List of adaptable lens mounts ===
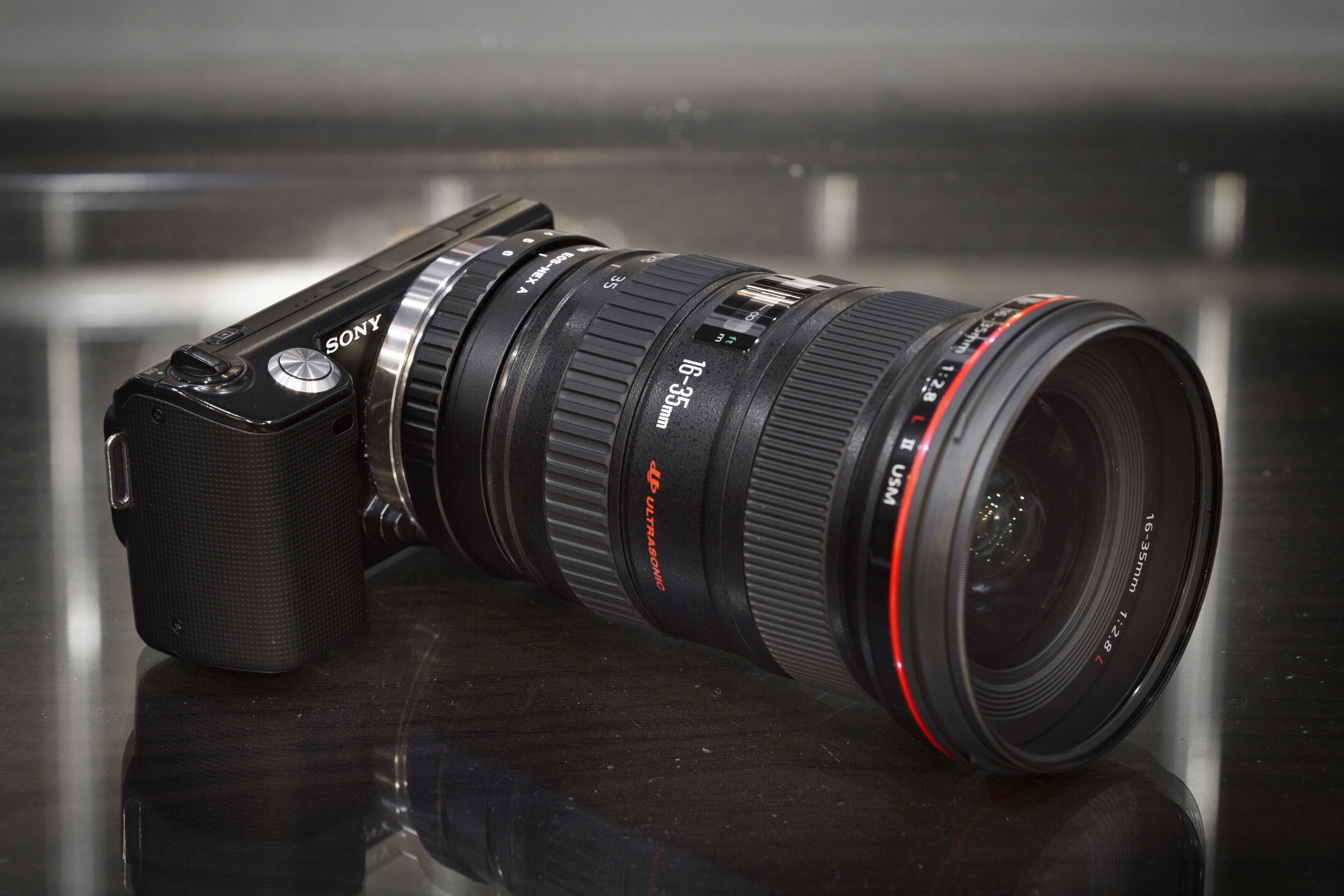
Canon EF 16-35mm f/2.8 L IS lens adapted to the Sony NEX-5 with a "dummy" non-electronic adapter.

The following lens mounts can be used on the Sony E-mount with the use of various adapters available from third parties:

- Alpha mount
- Sony A-mount (Sony LA-EA1, LA-EA2, LA-EA3, LA-EA4, LA-EA5 with AF and electronic aperture control, 3rd part adapters with aperture ring)
- BNCR mount
- C-mount
- Canon EF and Canon EF-S (Sigma MC-11 EF-E and other adapters with AF and electronic aperture control, "dumb" adapter variant with tilt available)
- Canon FD
- Contax G
- Contax N
- Contarex
- Contax/Yashica (C/Y) bayonet (an adapter variant with tilt is also available)
- Exakta lens mount
- Fujica X bayonet
- Hasselblad Xpan
- Konica AR (bayonet)
- Leica M-mount (bayonet) (adapter with back focusing AF available)
- Leica M39 lens mount (LTM/L39) (screw)
- Leica R-mount (adapter variant with tilt available)
- M42-mount (screw) (adapter variant with tilt available)
- Micro Four Thirds
- Minolta SR-mount (MD/MC)
- Minolta/Konica Minolta A-mount (Minolta/Konica Minolta AF/α/Dynax/Maxxum and Sony α DSLRs) (Sony LA-EA1, LA-EA2, LA-EA3, LA-EA4 with AF and electronic aperture control, and third-party adapters with aperture ring)
- Nikon F-mount (with AF and electronic aperture control, adapter variant with aperture ring for G lenses available, adapter variant with tilt available)
- Olympus OM-mount (adapter variant with tilt available)
- Olympus Pen F
- Pentax Auto 110
- Pentax K-mount (adapter variant with aperture ring for DA lenses available)
- PL mount
- Rollei-mount
- Sigma SA-mount (Sigma MC-11 SA-E with AF and electronic aperture control)
- T2-mount (screw)
- Sirui (Astra 1.33X Auto AF 50mm+75mm+100MM Anamorphic Cine Lens)

=== List of Sony E-mount adapters with a focal reducer ===
A focal reducer is a device which inserts between main lens and camera and shrinks image circle while simultaneously increasing the f-stop of the lens. The downside is that only lenses from other systems with longer flange distance are accepted. Native E-mount lenses are not supported.

- Metabones Speed Booster, from full-frame SLR to APS-C, 0.71x
- Metabones Speed Booster Ultra, from full-frame SLR to APS-C, 0.71x
- Zhongyi Lens Turbo, from full-from frame SLR to APS-C, 0.71x
- Kipon Baveyes Ultra 0.7x Adapter, from Medium Format SLR to Sony-E full-frame (announced 2016)
- Kipon Baveyes L/M-S/E 0.65x, from Leica M-mount to Sony APS-C (announced 2016)

== See also ==
- List of Sony E-mount cameras
- List of Sony E-mount lenses
- List of third-party Sony E-mount lenses

| Family | Level | Format | '10 | 2011 | | 2012 | 2013 | 2014 | 2015 | 2016 | 2017 | 2018 | 2019 | 2020 | 2021 | 2022 | 2023 | 2024 | 2025 | 2026 |
|---|---|---|---|---|---|---|---|---|---|---|---|---|---|---|---|---|---|---|---|---|
| Alpha (α) | Indust | FF | | | | | | | | | | | | | | | | ILX-LR1 ^{●} | | |
| Alpha (α) | Cine line | FF | | | | | | | | | | | | | _{m} FX6 ^{●} | | | | | |
| Alpha (α) | Cine line | FF | | | | | | | | | | | | | _{m} FX3 ^{AT●} | | | | | |
| Alpha (α) | Cine line | FF | | | | | | | | | | | | | | | | | | _{m} FX2 ^{AT●} |
| Alpha (α) | Flag | FF | | | | | | | | | | | | | _{m} α1 ^{FT●} | | | | _{m} α1 II ^{FAT●} | |
| Alpha (α) | Speed | FF | | | | | | | | | | _{m} α9 ^{FT●} | | | _{m} α9 II ^{FT●} | | | | _{m} α9 III ^{FAT●} | |
| Alpha (α) | Sens | FF | | | | | | | _{m} α7S ^{●} | _{m} α7S II ^{F●} | | | | | _{m} α7S III ^{AT●} | | | | | |
| Alpha (α) | Hi-Res | FF | | | | | | _{m} α7R ^{●} | | _{m} α7R II ^{F●} | | _{m} α7R III ^{FT●} | | _{m} α7R IV ^{FT●} | | | _{m} α7R V ^{FAT●} | | | |
| Alpha (α) | Basic | FF | | | | | | _{m} α7 ^{F●} | _{m} α7 II ^{F●} | | | | _{m} α7 III ^{FT●} | | | _{m} α7 IV ^{AT●} | | | | _{m} α7 V ^{FAT●} |
| Alpha (α) | Compact | FF | | | | | | | | | | | | | | | | _{m} α7CR ^{AT●} | | |
| Alpha (α) | Compact | FF | | | | | | | | | | | | | _{m} α7C ^{AT●} | | | _{m} α7C II ^{AT●} | | |
| Alpha (α) | Vlog | FF | | | | | | | | | | | | | | | | _{m} ZV-E1 ^{AT●} | | |
| Alpha (α) | Cine | APS-C | | | | | | | | | | | | | | | _{m} FX30 ^{AT●} | | | |
| Alpha (α) | Adv | APS-C | | | _{s} NEX-7 ^{F●} | | | | | | _{m} α6500 ^{FT●} | | | _{m} α6600 ^{FT●} | | | | _{m} α6700 ^{AT●} | | |
| Alpha (α) | Mid-range | APS-C | | | | _{m} NEX-6 ^{F●} | | | | | _{m} α6300 ^{F●} | | _{m} α6400 ^{F+T●} | | | | | | | |
| Alpha (α) | Mid-range | APS-C | | | | | | _{m} α6000 ^{F●} | | | | | | _{m} α6100 ^{FT●} | | | | | | |
| Alpha (α) | Vlog | APS-C | | | | | | | | | | | | | | _{m} ZV-E10 ^{AT●} | | | _{m} ZV-E10 II ^{AT●} | |
| Alpha (α) | Entry-level | APS-C | NEX-5 ^{F●} | NEX-5N ^{FT●} | | NEX-5R ^{F+T●} | NEX-5T ^{F+T●} | | α5100 ^{F+T●} | | | | | | | | | | | |
| Alpha (α) | Entry-level | APS-C | NEX-3 ^{F●} | NEX-C3 ^{F●} | | NEX-F3 ^{F+●} | NEX-3N ^{F+●} | α5000 ^{F+●} | | | | | | | | | | | | |
| DSLR-style | | APS-C | | | | | _{m} α3000 ^{●} | | _{m} α3500 ^{●} | | | | | | | | | | | |
| SmartShot | | APS-C | | | | | | | QX1 ^{M●} | | | | | | | | | | | |
| CineAlta | Cine line | FF | | | | | | | | | | VENICE | | | | VENICE 2 | | | | |
| CineAlta | Cine line | FF | | | | | | | | | | | | | | | | BURANO | | |
| XDCAM | Cine line | FF | | | | | | | | | | | | _{m} FX9 | | | | | | |
| XDCAM | Docu | S35 | | | | | | | _{m} FS7 | | _{m} FS7 II | | | | | | | | | |
| XDCAM | Mobile | S35 | | | | | | | | _{m} FS5 | | | _{m} FS5 II | | | | | | | |
| NXCAM | Pro | S35 | | NEX-FS100 | | NEX-FS700 | NEX-FS700R | | | | | | | | | | | | | |
| NXCAM | APS-C | | | | | NEX-EA50 | | | | | | | | | | | | | | |
| Handycam | FF | | | | | _{m} NEX-VG900 | | | | | | | | | | | | | | |
| Handycam | APS-C | | _{s} NEX-VG10 | | _{s} NEX-VG20 | _{m} NEX-VG30 | | | | | | | | | | | | | | |
| Security | | FF | | | | | | | | | SNC-VB770 | | | | | | | | | |
| Security | | FF | | | | | | | | | UMC-S3C | | | | | | | | | |
| Family | Level | Format | | | | | | | | | | | | | | | | | | |
| Family | Level | Format | '10 | 2011 | | 2012 | 2013 | 2014 | 2015 | 2016 | 2017 | 2018 | 2019 | 2020 | 2021 | 2022 | 2023 | 2024 | 2025 | 2026 |
