= List of Sony A-mount cameras =

Sony released the following A-mount cameras since 2006. They are all part of the Sony α system.

List of Sony A-mount cameras:

Name	Model	Code	ID	Type	Format	Sensor	Hotshoe	Latest firmware	User level	Announce date	Release date	Availability
Sony α900	DSLR-A900	CX85100, CX62500	257 (FF), 262 (APS-C)	DSLR	Full frame	CMOS	Auto-lock Accessory Shoe (4-pin iISO)	2.00	Professional	2008-09-09 (2007-03-08)	2008-09	Discontinued (2011-10)
Sony α850	DSLR-A850	CX86700	269 (FF), 270 (APS-C)	DSLR	Full frame	CMOS	Auto-lock Accessory Shoe (4-pin iISO)	2.00	Professional	2009-08-27	2009-09	Discontinued (2011-07)
Sony α99	SLT-A99V (with GPS), SLT-A99 (without GPS), (Hasselblad HV)	CX87500	294	SLT	Full frame	CMOS	Multi Interface Shoe	1.02	Professional	2012-09-12	2012-11	Discontinued (2016)
Sony α99 II	ILCA-99M2		354	SLT	Full frame	CMOS	Multi Interface Shoe	1.01	Professional	2016-09-19	2016-09	Discontinued (2020)
Sony α100	DSLR-A100, DSLR-A100/S (silver-colored body)	CX62100, CX62110, CX62120	256	DSLR	APS-C	CCD	Auto-lock Accessory Shoe (4-pin iISO)	1.04	Midrange	2006-06-05	2006-07	Discontinued (2008-01-05)
Sony α700	DSLR-A700 (only US-model with grip-sensor)	CX62300, CX62320	258	DSLR	APS-C	CMOS	Auto-lock Accessory Shoe (4-pin iISO)	4	Advanced	2007-09-05 (2007-03-08)	2007-09	Discontinued (2009-07)
Sony α200	DSLR-A200	CX62700	259	DSLR	APS-C	CCD	Auto-lock Accessory Shoe (4-pin iISO)	1.00	Entry level	2008-01-06	2008-01	Discontinued
Sony α300	DSLR-A300, DSLR-A300K/N (champagne gold-colored set)	CX62800	261	DSLR	APS-C	CCD	Auto-lock Accessory Shoe (4-pin iISO)	1.00	Entry level	2008-01-30	2008-01	Discontinued
Sony α350	DSLR-A350, DSLR-A350K/N (champagne gold-colored set)	CX62900	260	DSLR	APS-C	CCD	Auto-lock Accessory Shoe (4-pin iISO)	1.00	Entry level	2008-01-30	2008-01	Discontinued
Sony α230	DSLR-A230	CX85500	265	DSLR	APS-C	CCD	Auto-lock Accessory Shoe (4-pin iISO)	1.10	Entry level	2009-05-17	2009-05	Discontinued (2010-01-19)
Sony α330	DSLR-A330, DSLR-A330L/T (copper brown-colored set)	CX85200	264	DSLR	APS-C	CCD	Auto-lock Accessory Shoe (4-pin iISO)	1.10	Entry level	2009-05-17	2009-05	Discontinued (2010-05)
Sony α380	DSLR-A380	CX85600	263	DSLR	APS-C	CCD	Auto-lock Accessory Shoe (4-pin iISO)	1.10	Entry level	2009-05-17	2009-05	Discontinued (2010-05)
Sony α500	DSLR-A500	CX85700	274	DSLR	APS-C	CMOS	Auto-lock Accessory Shoe (4-pin iISO)	1.00	Midrange	2009-08-27	2009-10	Discontinued
Sony α550	DSLR-A550	CX85800	273	DSLR	APS-C	CMOS	Auto-lock Accessory Shoe (4-pin iISO)	1.00	Midrange	2009-08-27		
Sony α450	DSLR-A450	CX85900	275	DSLR	APS-C	CMOS	Auto-lock Accessory Shoe (4-pin iISO)	1.00	Midrange	2010-01-05	2010-02	Discontinued
Sony α290	DSLR-A290	CX86100	266	DSLR	APS-C	CCD	Auto-lock Accessory Shoe (4-pin iISO)	1.00	Entry level	2010-06-09	2010-06	Discontinued (2011-06-08)
Sony α390	DSLR-A390	CX86200	263	DSLR	APS-C	CCD	Auto-lock Accessory Shoe (4-pin iISO)	1.00	Entry level	2010-06-09	2010-06	Discontinued (2011-06-08)
Sony α560	DSLR-A560	CX86500	282	DSLR	APS-C	CMOS	Auto-lock Accessory Shoe (4-pin iISO)	1.00/1.11	Midrange	2010-08-24	2010-08	Discontinued (2010-11-12)
Sony α580	DSLR-A580	CX86600, CX86610	283	DSLR	APS-C	CMOS	Auto-lock Accessory Shoe (4-pin iISO)	1.00/1.11	Midrange	2010-08-24	2010-08	Discontinued (2012-03)
Sony α33	SLT-A33	CX86300, CX86310, CX86311, CX86320	280	SLT	APS-C	CMOS	Auto-lock Accessory Shoe (4-pin iISO)	2.00	Entry level	2010-08-24	2010-08	Discontinued
Sony α55	SLT-A55V (with GPS), SLT-A55 (without GPS)	CX86400, CX86410	281	SLT	APS-C	CMOS	Auto-lock Accessory Shoe (4-pin iISO)	2.00	Midrange	2010-08-24	2010-08	Discontinued
Sony α35	SLT-A35	CX86900, CX86910	285	SLT	APS-C	CMOS	Auto-lock Accessory Shoe (4-pin iISO)	1.00	Entry level	2011-06-08	2011-08	Discontinued
Sony α65	SLT-A65V (with GPS), SLT-A65 (without GPS)	CX86800, CX86810	286	SLT	APS-C	CMOS	Auto-lock Accessory Shoe (4-pin iISO)	1.07	Midrange	2011-08-24	2011-10	Discontinued
Sony α77	SLT-A77V (with GPS), SLT-A77 (without GPS)	CX87000, CX87010	287	SLT	APS-C	CMOS	Auto-lock Accessory Shoe (4-pin iISO)	1.07	Advanced	2011-08-24 (2010-02-21)	2011-10	Discontinued
Sony α57	SLT-A57	CX87400	292	SLT	APS-C	CMOS	Auto-lock Accessory Shoe (4-pin iISO)	1.04	Midrange	2012-03-13	2012-04	Discontinued
Sony α37	SLT-A37	CX87100	291	SLT	APS-C	CMOS	Auto-lock Accessory Shoe (4-pin iISO)	1.04	Entry level	2012-05-17	2012-06	Discontinued
Sony α58	SLT-A58	CX87600	303	SLT	APS-C	CMOS	Multi Interface Shoe	1.01	Midrange	2013-02-20	2013-04	Discontinued
Sony α77 II	ILCA-77M2		319	SLT	APS-C	CMOS	Multi Interface Shoe	2.00	Advanced	2014-05-01	2014-05	Discontinued (2020)
Sony α68	ILCA-68		353	SLT	APS-C	CMOS	Multi Interface Shoe	1.00	Mid-range	2015-11-05	2016-04	Discontinued (2020)

== See also ==
- List of Konica Minolta A-mount cameras
- List of Minolta A-mount cameras
- List of Konica Minolta A-mount lenses
- List of Minolta A-mount lenses
- List of Sony α cameras
- List of Sony E-mount cameras
- List of Sony A-mount lenses

Level	Sensor	2004	2005	2006	2007	2008	2009	2010	2011		2012	2013	2014	2015	2016	2017	2018	2019	2020
Professional	Full frame						α900					α99				α99 II			
Professional	Full frame							α850											
High-end	APS-C		DG-7D			α700				α77				α77 II					
Midrange	APS-C									α65					α68				
Upper-entry	APS-C								α55		α57								
Upper-entry	APS-C				α100			α550 ^{F}	α580				α58						
Upper-entry	APS-C		DG-5D					α500	α560										
Upper-entry	APS-C							α450											
Entry-level	APS-C								α33	α35	α37								
Entry-level	APS-C					α350 ^{F}		α380	α390										
Entry-level	APS-C					α300		α330											
Entry-level	APS-C					α200		α230	α290										
Early models	Minolta 7000 with SB-70/SB-70S (1986) · Minolta 9000 with SB-90/SB-90S (1986) (Still video SLRs); Minolta MS-C1100 (1992) · Minolta RD-175 (1995)																		
Level	Sensor																		
Level	Sensor	2004	2005	2006	2007	2008	2009	2010	2011		2012	2013	2014	2015	2016	2017	2018	2019	2020
