= List of Sony α cameras =

Sony Alpha-branded cameras

Sony offers a number of interchangeable-lens cameras in its α (Alpha) line. The line has featured cameras employing three different imaging technologies and two mounts:

- Digital single-lens reflex cameras (DSLR) – early α models with three-digit model numbers employ this technology; they all feature Sony's A-mount.
- SLT (defined by Sony as "single-lens translucent") – similar in appearance to a DSLR, but featuring a fixed semi-reflective mirror. All cameras employing this technology have had two-digit model numbers, with model designations of the form "SLT-A##" or "ILCA-##". Like DSLRs, they all feature Sony's A-mount.
- Mirrorless interchangeable-lens cameras – these cameras have no mirror between the lens and sensor. All NEX and ILCE models use this technology and feature Sony's E-mount. (In addition to these cameras, Sony also offers E-mount cameras, which are not part of the α line, but the Handycam, NXCAM and XDCAM systems.)

== List of Sony α system E-mount cameras ==
Name	Model	Release date	Code	ID	System	Type	Format (crop f.)	Sensor	Touch to focus	Touch menus	5 axis IBIS	Eye AF	Fastest mech. shutter speed	Max FPS Cont. Shooting Mech. shutter	Fastest elec. shutter speed	Max FPS Cont. Shooting Elec. shutter	Phase Detect AF points	Contrast AF points	Max ISO in Auto modes	Custom buttons on the body	Mem. buffer	Screen	Viewfinder	Flash	Battery	Weight	Full HD Video	4k Video	Video duration limit	S&Q Slow and Quick video	DxOMark Low Light ISO	Charging	Hotshoe	Latest firmware	User level	Announce date	Availability
Sony NEX-3	NEX-3 (with Eye-Fi), NEX-3C (without Eye-Fi)	2010-06	CX75210	279	α (Alpha)	MILC	APS-C, 23.4×15.6mm (1.5×)	CMOS, Exmor, 14.2 MP	No touch to focus	No touch menus	No IBIS	No	1/4000 s	7 fps without AF-C, 2.3 fps with AF-C	No Silent Electronic Shutter		0	25															Smart Accessory Terminal 1	5	Entry level	2010-02-21, 2010-05-11	Discontinued
Sony NEX-5	NEX-5 (with Eye-Fi), NEX-5C (without Eye-Fi)	2010-06	CX75110, CX75121, CX75141	278	α (Alpha)	MILC	APS-C, 23.4×15.6mm (1.5×)	CMOS, Exmor, 14.2 MP	No touch to focus	No touch menus	No IBIS	No	1/4000 s	7 fps without AF-C, 2.3 fps with AF-C	No Silent Electronic Shutter		0	25	1600 ISO	No custom buttons on the body		Tiltable 45° down and 90° up	Sony FDA-EV1S viewfinder accessory	Flash accessory	1080 mAh NP-FW50	287 g	1920 x 1080	No 4k video	30 min video duration limit	NO S&Q Slow and Quick video	796 DxOMark Low Light ISO	Battery can only be charged in external charger	Smart Accessory Terminal 1	5	Midrange	2010-02-21, 2010-05-11	Discontinued
Sony NEX-C3	NEX-C3	2011-08	CX75400, CX75420	284	α (Alpha)	MILC	APS-C (1.5×)	CMOS, Exmor HD, 16.2 MP	No touch to focus	No touch menus	No IBIS	No	1/4000 s	7 fps without AF-C, 2.3 fps with AF-C	No Silent Electronic Shutter		0	25															Smart Accessory Terminal 1	2	Entry level	2011-06-08	Discontinued
Sony NEX-5N	NEX-5N	2011-09	CX75500, CX75520	288	α (Alpha)	MILC	APS-C (1.5×)	CMOS, Exmor HD, 16.1 MP	Touch to focus	Yes, touch menus	No IBIS	No	1/4000 s	10 fps without AF-C, 3 fps with AF-C	No Silent Electronic Shutter		0	25	3200 ISO	No custom buttons on the body		Tiltable 45° down and 90° up	Sony FDA-EV1S viewfinder accessory	Flash accessory	1080 mAh NP-FW50	269 g	1920 x 1080	No 4k video	30 min video duration limit	NO S&Q Slow and Quick video	1079 DxOMark Low Light ISO	Battery can only be charged in external charger	Smart Accessory Terminal 2	1.02	Midrange	2011-08-24	Discontinued
Sony NEX-7	NEX-7, Hasselblad Lunar, Hasselblad Lunar Limited Edition	2011-12	CX75600, CX75620	289	α (Alpha)	MILC	APS-C, 23.5×15.6mm (1.5×)	CMOS, Exmor HD, 24.3 MP	No touch to focus	No touch menus	No IBIS	No	1/4000 s	10 fps without AF-C, 3 fps with AF-C	No Silent Electronic Shutter		0	25															Auto-lock Accessory Shoe (4-pin iISO)	1.03	Advanced Amateur	2011-08-24	Discontinued
Sony NEX-F3	NEX-F3	2012-06	CX75700	293	α (Alpha)	MILC	APS-C, 23.5×15.6mm (1.5×)	CMOS, Exmor HD, 16.1 MP	No touch to focus	No touch menus	No IBIS	No	1/4000 s	5.5 fps without AF-C, 2.5 fps with AF-C	No Silent Electronic Shutter		0	25															Smart Accessory Terminal 2	1.01	Entry level	2012-05-17	Discontinued
Sony NEX-5R	NEX-5R	2012-10	CX75820	296	α (Alpha)	MILC	APS-C (1.5×)	CMOS, Exmor HD, 16.1 MP	Touch to focus	Touch menus	No IBIS	No	1/4000 s	10 fps without AF-C, 3 fps with AF-C	No Silent Electronic Shutter		99	25															Smart Accessory Terminal 2	1.03	Midrange	2012-08-29	Discontinued
Sony NEX-6	NEX-6	2012-11	CX76060	295	α (Alpha)	MILC	APS-C, 23.5×15.6mm (1.5×)	CMOS, Exmor HD, 16.1 MP	No touch to focus	No touch menus	No IBIS	No	1/4000 s	10 fps without AF-C, 3 fps with AF-C	No Silent Electronic Shutter		99	25															Multi Interface Shoe	1.03	Advanced Amateur	2012-09-12	Discontinued
Sony NEX-3N	NEX-3N	2013-03	CX76200	305	α (Alpha)	MILC	APS-C, ca. 23.5×15.6mm (1.5×)	CMOS, Exmor HD, ca. 16 MP	No touch to focus	No touch menus	No IBIS	No	1/4000 s	4 fps without AF-C, 2.5 fps with AF-C	No Silent Electronic Shutter		0	25	3200 ISO	No custom buttons		Tiltable 90° up	None	In-body pop-up	1080 mAh NP-FW50	269 g	1920x 1080	No 4k	30 min video duration limit			Can be charged in body, or in external charger	N/A	1.00	Entry level	2013-02-20	Discontinued
Sony NEX-5T	NEX-5T	2013-09	CX76500	307	α (Alpha)	MILC	APS-C (1.5×)	CMOS, Exmor HD, 16.1 MP	Touch to focus	Touch menus	No IBIS	No	1/4000 s	10 fps without AF-C, 3 fps with AF-C	No Silent Electronic Shutter		99	25															Smart Accessory Terminal 2	1.01	Midrange	2013-08-24	Discontinued
Sony α3000	ILCE-3000	2013-08	CX77100, CX77121	302	α (Alpha)	MILC	APS-C, ca. 23.5×15.6mm (1.5×)	CMOS, Exmor HD, 20.1 MP	No touch to focus	No touch menus	No IBIS	No	1/4000 s	3.5 fps without AF-C, 2.5 fps with AF-C	No Silent Electronic Shutter		0	25															Multi Interface Shoe	1.00/1.01	Entry level	2013-08-27	Discontinued
Sony α7	ILCE-7	2013-11	CX77800	306	α (Alpha)	MILC	Full frame, 35.8×23.9mm, (1.0×)	CMOS, Exmor HD, 24.3 MP	No touch to focus	No touch menus	No IBIS	AF-S	1/8000 s	5 fps without live view, 2.5 fps with live view	No Silent Electronic Shutter		117	25															Multi Interface Shoe	3.20	Semi-Professional	2013-10-16	Discontinued
Sony α7R	ILCE-7R, Hasselblad Lusso	2013-11	CX77900	311	α (Alpha)	MILC	Full frame, 35.9×24.0mm, (1.0×)	CMOS, Exmor HD, 36.4 MP	No touch to focus	No touch menus	No IBIS	AF-S	1/8000 s	4 fps without AF-C, 1.5 fps with AF-C	No Silent Electronic Shutter		0	25															Multi Interface Shoe	3.20	Semi-Professional	2013-10-16	Discontinued
Sony α5000	ILCE-5000	2014-03	CX77300, CX77361	313	α (Alpha)	MILC	APS-C, ca. 23.2×15.4mm (1.5×)	CMOS, Exmor HD, 20.1 MP	No touch to focus	No touch menus	No IBIS	AF-S	1/4000 s	2.5 fps with live view	No Silent Electronic Shutter		0	25	3200 ISO	No custom buttons on the body		Tiltable 180° up	No viewfinder	In-body pop-up	1080 mAh NP-FW50	269 g	1920 x 1080	No 4k video	30 min video duration limit	NO S&Q Slow and Quick video	1089 DxOMark Low Light ISO	Battery can be charged with micro-USB cable or in external charger. Can't be charged while in use.	N/A	1.10	Entry level	2014-01-07	Discontinued
Sony α6000	ILCE-6000	2014-04	CX77500	312	α (Alpha)	MILC	APS-C, ca. 23.5×15.6mm (1.5×)	CMOS, Exmor HD, 24.3 MP	No touch to focus	No touch menus	No IBIS	AF-S	1/4000 s	11 fps without live view (HI), 2.5 fps with live view (LO)	No Silent Electronic Shutter		179	25	3200 ISO	C1, C2, AEL, Rotary dial		Tiltable 45° down and 90° up	1440 k dots viewfinder	In body pop-up tiltable flash	1020 mAh NP-FW50	344 g		No 4k video	30 min video duration limit	NO S&Q Slow and Quick video	1347 DxOMark Low Light ISO	Battery can be charged with micro-USB cable or in external charger. Can't be charged while in use.	Multi Interface Shoe	3.20	Advanced Amateur	2014-02-12	Discontinued
Sony α3500	ILCE-3500	2014-03	CX77100	302	α (Alpha)	MILC	APS-C, ca. 23.2×15.4mm (1.5×)	CMOS, Exmor HD, 20.1 MP	No touch to focus	No touch menus	No IBIS	No	1/4000 s	3.5 fps without AF-C, 2.5 fps with AF-C	No Silent Electronic Shutter		0	25															Multi Interface Shoe	1.01	Entry level	2014-03-21	Discontinued
Sony α7S	ILCE-7S	2014-06	CX78500	318	α (Alpha)	MILC	Full frame, 35.6×23.8mm, (1.0×)	CMOS, Exmor HD, 12.2 MP	No touch to focus	No touch menus	No IBIS	AF-S	1/8000 s	5 fps without AF-C or live view, 2.5 fps with AF-C and live view	1/8000 s	5 fps without AF-C or live view, 2.5 fps with AF-C and live view	0	25															Multi Interface Shoe	3.20	Semi-Professional	2014-04-06	Current
Sony α5100	ILCE-5100	2014-09	CX78300?	339	α (Alpha)	MILC	APS-C, approx. 23.5×15.6mm (1.5×)	CMOS, Exmor HD, 24.3 MP	Touch to focus	No touch menus	No IBIS	AF-S	1/4000 s	6 fps without live view (HI), 3 fps with live view (LO)	No Silent Electronic Shutter		179	25	3200 ISO	No custom buttons on the body		Tiltable 180° up	No viewfinder	In body pop-up tiltable flash	1020 mAh NP-FW50	283 g		No 4k video	30 min video duration limit	NO S&Q Slow and Quick video	1347 DxOMark Low Light ISO		N/A	3.10	Entry level	2014-08-18	Discontinued
Sony α7 II	ILCE-7M2	2015-01		340	α (Alpha)	MILC	Full frame, 35.8×23.9mm, (1.0×)	CMOS, Exmor HD, 24.3 MP	No touch to focus	No touch menus	5 axis IBIS	AF-S	1/8000 s	5 fps without live view (HI), 2.5 fps with live view (LO)	No Silent Electronic Shutter		117	25															Multi Interface Shoe	4.00	Semi-Professional	2014-11-20	Discontinued
Sony α7R II	ILCE-7RM2	2015-06		347	α (Alpha)	MILC	Full frame, 35.8×23.9mm, (1.0×)	BSI CMOS, Exmor R HD, 42.4 MP	No touch to focus	No touch menus	5 axis IBIS	AF-C	1/8000 s	5 fps without live view (HI), 2.5 fps with live view (LO)	1/8000 s	5 fps without live view (HI), 2.5 fps with live view (LO)	399	25															Multi Interface Shoe	4.00	Semi-Professional	2015-06-10	Discontinued
Sony α7S II	ILCE-7SM2	2015-11		350	α (Alpha)	MILC	Full frame, 35.6×23.8mm, (1.0×)	CMOS, Exmor HD, 12.2 MP	No touch to focus	No touch menus	5 axis IBIS	AF-S	1/8000 s	5 fps without AF-C or live view, 2.5 fps with AF-C and live view	1/8000 s	5 fps without AF-C or live view, 2.5 fps with AF-C and live view	0	169															Multi Interface Shoe	3.00	Semi-Professional	2015-09-11	Current
Sony α7S III	ILCE-7SM3	2020-09			α (Alpha)	MILC	Full frame, 35.6×23.8mm, (1.0×)	CMOS, Exmor HD, 12.1 MP			5 axis IBIS		1/8000 s				759	425								614g							Multi Interface Shoe	2.00	Semi-Professional	2020-07-28	Current
Sony α6300	ILCE-6300	2016-03		357	α (Alpha)	MILC	APS-C, ca. 23.5×15.6mm (1.5×)	CMOS, Exmor, 24.2 MP	No touch to focus	No touch menus	No IBIS	AF-C	1/4000 s	11 fps without live view (HI+), 8 fps with live view (HI)	1/4000 s electronic shutter	2.5 fps in silent mode (LO)	425	169		C1, C2, AEL, AF/MF, Rotary dial		Tiltable 45° down and 90° up	2359 k dots, 100 Hz viewfinder	In body pop-up tiltable flash	1020 mAh NP-FW50	403 g		4k video	30 min video duration limit	1 fps to 120 fps S&Q Slow and Quick video	1437 DxOMark Low Light ISO	Battery can be charged with micro-USB cable or in external charger. Can't be charged while in use.	Multi Interface Shoe	2.01	Advanced Amateur	2016-02-03	Discontinued
Sony α6500	ILCE-6500	2016-12		?	α (Alpha)	MILC	APS-C, ca. 23.5×15.6mm (1.5×)	CMOS, Exmor, 24.2 MP	Touch to focus	No touch menus	5 axis IBIS	AF-C	1/4000 s	11 fps without live view (HI+), 8 fps with live view (HI)	1/4000 s electronic shutter	2.5 fps in silent mode (LO)	425	169	6400 ISO	C1, C2, C3, AEL, AF/MF, Rotary dial		Tiltable 45° down and 90° up	2359 k dots, 100 Hz viewfinder	In body pop-up tiltable flash	1020 mAh NP-FW50	453 g		4k video	30 min video duration limit	1 fps to 120 fps S&Q Slow and Quick video	1405 DxOMark Low Light ISO	CAN be charged while in use. Battery can be charged with micro-USB cable or in external charger.	Multi Interface Shoe	1.05	Advanced Amateur	2016-10-06	Discontinued
Sony α9	ILCE-9	2017-05		?	α (Alpha)	MILC	Full frame, 35.9×24.0mm, (1.0×)	CMOS, Exmor HD, 24.2 MP	Touch to focus	No touch menus	5 axis IBIS	Real-time	1/8000 s	5 fps (HI+)	1/32,768 electronic shutter only works in M and S modes	20 fps (HI+), 10 fps (HI) in silent mode	693	425		C1, C2, C3, C4, AEL, AF-On, 2xRotary dial, Exposure compensation		Tiltable 45° down and 90° up	3686 k dots, 100 Hz viewfinder	NO in body pop-up tiltable flash	2280 mAh NP-FZ100	673 g		4k video	30 min video duration limit	1 fps to 120 fps S&Q Slow and Quick video	3517 DxOMark Low Light ISO		Multi Interface Shoe	4.10	Professional	2017-04-19	Current
Sony α7R III	ILCE-7RM3	2017-11		?	α (Alpha)	MILC	Full frame, 35.8×23.9mm, (1.0×)	BSI CMOS, Exmor R HD, 42.4 MP	Touch to focus	No touch menus	5 axis IBIS	Real-time	1/8000 s	10 fps without live view (HI+), 8 fps with live view (HI)	1/8000 s	10 fps without live view (HI+), 8 fps with live view (HI)	399	425		C1, C2, C3, C4, AEL, AF-On, 2xRotary dial, Exposure compensation		Tiltable 45° down and 90° up	2359 k dots, 100 Hz viewfinder	NO in body pop-up tiltable flash	2280 mAh NP-FZ100				30 min video duration limit	1 fps to 120 fps S&Q Slow and Quick video			Multi Interface Shoe	2.10	Professional	2017-10-25	Current
Sony α7 III	ILCE-7M3	2018-04		?	α (Alpha)	MILC	Full frame, 35.8×23.9mm, (1.0×)	BSI CMOS, Exmor R HD, 24.2 MP	Touch to focus	No touch menus	5 axis IBIS	Real-time	1/8000 s	10 fps without live view (HI+), 8 fps with live view (HI)	1/8000 s	10 fps without live view (HI+), 8 fps with live view (HI)	693	425		C1, C2, C3, C4, AEL, AF-On, 2xRotary dial, Exposure compensation		Tiltable 45° down and 90° up	2359 k dots, 100 Hz viewfinder	NO in body pop-up tiltable flash	2280 mAh NP-FZ100	650 g		4k video	30 min video duration limit	1 fps to 120 fps S&Q Slow and Quick video	3730 DxOMark Low Light ISO		Multi Interface Shoe	2.10	Semi-Professional	2018-02-27	Current
Sony α6400	ILCE-6400	2019-04		?	α (Alpha)	MILC	APS-C, ca. 23.5×15.6mm (1.5×)	CMOS, Exmor, 24.2 MP	Touch to focus	No touch menus	No IBIS	Real-time	1/4000 s	11 fps without live view (HI+), 8 fps with live view (HI)	1/4000 s electronic shutter	2.5 fps in silent mode (LO)	425	425		C1, C2, AEL, Rotary dial		Tiltable 45° down and 180° up	2359 k dots, 100 Hz viewfinder	In body pop-up tiltable flash	1020 mAh NP-FW50	404 g		4k video	unlimited video duration	1 fps to 120 fps S&Q Slow and Quick video	1431 DxOMark Low Light ISO		Multi Interface Shoe	?	Advanced Amateur	2019-01-15	Current
Sony α7R IV	ILCE-7RM4	2019-09		?	α (Alpha)	MILC	Full frame, 35.7×23.8mm (1.0×)	BSI CMOS, Exmor R HD, 61 MP	Touch to focus	No touch menus	5 axis IBIS	Real-time	1/8000 s	10 fps	1/8000 s	10 fps	567	425	32.000 ISO	C1, C2, C3, C4, AEL, AF-On, 2 rotary dials, exposure compensation		Tiltable 45° down and 90° up	5.760 k dots, 100–120 Hz viewfinder	NO in body pop-up tiltable flash	2280 mAh NP-FZ100	665 g		4k video	unlimited video duration	1 fps to 120 fps S&Q Slow and Quick video	3344 DxOMark Low Light ISO	Can be charged while in use. Battery can be charged with micro-USB cable, USB-C-cable, or in external charger.	Multi Interface Shoe	1.20	Professional	2019-07-16	Discontinued
Sony α6600	ILCE-6600	2019-10			α (Alpha)	MILC	APS-C, ca. 23.5×15.6mm (1.5×)	CMOS, Exmor, 24.2 MP	Touch to focus	No touch menus	5 axis IBIS	Real-time	1/4000 s	11 fps without live view (HI+), 8 fps with live view (HI)	1/4000 s electronic shutter	2.5 fps in silent mode (LO)	425	425		C1, C2, C3, C4, AEL, AF/MF, Rotary dial		Tiltable 45° down and 180° up	2359 k dots, 100 Hz viewfinder	No in body pop-up tiltable flash	2280 mAh NP-FZ100	503 g		4k video	unlimited video duration	1 fps to 120 fps S&Q Slow and Quick video			Multi Interface Shoe	2.00	Advanced Amateur	2019-08-28	Current
Sony α6100	ILCE-6100	2019-10			α (Alpha)	MILC	APS-C, ca. 23.5×15.6mm (1.5×)	CMOS, Exmor, 24.2 MP	Touch to focus	No touch menus	No IBIS	Real-time	1/4000 s	11 fps without live view (HI+), 8 fps with live view (HI)	1/4000 s electronic shutter	2.5 fps in silent mode (LO)	425	425		C1, C2, AEL, Rotary dial		Tiltable 45° down and 180° up	1440 k dots viewfinder	In body pop-up tiltable flash	1020 mAh NP-FW50	396 g		4k video	unlimited video duration	1 fps to 120 fps S&Q Slow and Quick video			Multi Interface Shoe		Advanced Amateur	2019-08-28	Discontinued
Sony α9 II	ILCE-9M2	2019-10			α (Alpha)	MILC	Full frame, 35.6×23.8mm (1.0×)	BSI Stacked CMOS, Exmor RS, 24.2 MP	Touch to focus	No touch menus	5 axis IBIS	Real-time	1/8000 s	Hi: max. 10fps	1/32000	Hi: max. 20 fps	693	425					3686 k dots, STD 60fps / HI 120fps	NO in body pop-up tiltable flash	2280 mAh NP-FZ100	678 g		4k video	unlimited video duration				Multi Interface Shoe		Professional	2019-10-03	Current
Sony α7C	ILCE-7C	2020-10			α (Alpha)	MILC	35mm full frame (35.6 x 23.8mm)	CMOS, Exmor R, 24.2 MP			5 axis IBIS				1/4000 s electronic shutter		693	425				Articulating screen	2,359,296 dots viewfinder			509g		4k video	unlimited video duration				Multi Interface Shoe		Advanced Amateur	2020-09-14	Current
Sony α1	ILCE-1	2021-01			α (Alpha)	MILC	35 mm full frame (35.9 x 23.9 mm)	BSI Stacked CMOS, Exmor RS, 50.1 MP	Touch to focus	Touch menus	5 axis IBIS	Real-time	1/8000 s	Hi: max. 30fps	1/8000 s mechanical shutter; 1/32000 s electronic shutter		759	425		C1, C2, C3, C4, AEL, AF/MF, Rotary dial		Tiltable 41° down and 107° up	9.4M dots viewfinder	No flash	2280 mAh NP-FZ100	737g	1920 x 1080	8k video	unlimited video duration			Can be charged while in use. Battery can be charged with micro-USB cable, USB-C-cable, or in external charger.	Multi Interface Shoe		Flagship	2021-1-27	Current
Sony α7 IV	ILCE-7M4	2021-10			α (Alpha)	MILC	35 mm full frame (35.9 x 23.9 mm)	CMOS, Exmor R, 34.1 MP	Touch to focus	Touch menus	5 axis IBIS	Real-time	1/8000 s	Hi: max. 10fps	1/8000 s electronic shutter		759	425		C1, C2, C3, C4, AEL, AF/MF, Rotary dial		Articulating screen	3,686,400 dots viewfinder	No flash	2280 mAh NP-FZ100	665g	1920 x 1080	4k video	unlimited video duration			Can be charged while in use. Battery can be charged with micro-USB cable, USB-C-cable, or in external charger.	Multi Interface Shoe		Semi-Professional	2021-10-21	Current
Sony α7R V	ILCE-7RM5	2022-12			a (Alpha)	MILC	35mm full frame (35.7 x 23.8 mm)	CMOS, Exmor R, 61.0 MP	Touch to focus	Touch menus	5 axis IBIS	Real-time	1/8000 s	Hi: max. 10fps	1/8000 s electronic shutter		759	425						No in body pop-up flash.			3840 x 2860	4k video	unlimited video duration			Can be charged while in use. Battery can be charged with micro-USB cable, USB-C-cable, or in external charger.	Multi Interface Shoe		Semi-Professional	2022-10-26	Current
Sony α QX1	ILCE-QX1	2014-10		346	α (Alpha) QX-series	MILC (lens-type, smartphone-mounted)	APS-C, approx. 23.2×15.4mm (1.5×)	CMOS, 20.1 MP									0	25															None	Unknown	Advanced Amateur	2014-09-03	Discontinued
Sony PXW-FS5 II	PXW-FS5	2018-06			XDCAM	Camcorder	Super-35mm, 23.6×13.3mm, (1.6×)	CMOS, Exmor 4K, 11.6 MP																											Professional		Current
Sony PXW-FX9	PXW-FX9	2019-12			XDCAM	Camcorder	Full frame, 36.2×24.1mm, (1.0×)	CMOS, 6K, 24.4 MP																											Professional		Current
Sony FX6	ILME-FX6V / ILME-FX6VK	2020-11			α (Alpha)	Camcorder	Full frame, 35.6×23.8mm, (1.0×)	CMOS, EXMOR R, 12.9 MP																											Professional		Current
Sony FX3	ILME-FX3	2021-03			α (Alpha)	MILC	Full frame, 35.6×23.8mm, (1.0×)	CMOS, EXMOR R, 12.1 MP									759 (stills) 627 (movie)																		Professional		Current
Sony ZV-E10		2021-07					APS-C, 23.4×15.6mm (1.5×)	CMOS, Exmor R, 24.2 MP									425	425																			
Sony ZV-E1		2023-05					Full frame, 35.6×23.8mm, (1.0×)	CMOS, Exmor R, 12.1 MP									759 (stills) 627 (movie)																				
Sony α6700	ILCE-6700	2023-08			α (Alpha)	MILC	APS-C, 23.3×15.5 mm (1.5×)	CMOS, Exmor R, 26.0 MP	Touch to focus	Touch menus	5 axis IBIS	Real-time	1/4000 s	11 fps without live view (HI+), 8 fps with live view (HI)	1/8000 s electronic shutter		759 (stills) 495 (movie)	425	32,000 ISO	C1, C2, C3, AF-ON, Front rotary dial, Rear rotary dial		Articulating screen	2359 k dots, 100 Hz viewfinder	No in body pop-up tiltable flash	2280 mAh NP-FZ100	409 g		4k video	unlimited video duration	1 fps to 240 fps S&Q Slow and Quick video			Multi Interface Shoe	2.00	Advanced Amateur	2023-07-12	Current
Sony α7C II	ILCE-7CM2	2023-09			α (Alpha)	MILC	35mm full frame (35.9 x 23.9mm)	CMOS, Exmor R, 33.0 MP			5 axis IBIS	Real-time	1/4000 s electronic shutter	Hi: max. 10fps	1/8000 s electronic shutter		759	425	12,800 ISO			Articulating screen	2,359,296 dots viewfinder		2280 mAh NP-FZ100	429 g		4k video	Unlimited video duration				Multi Interface Shoe		Advanced Amateur	2023-08-29	Current
Sony α7CR	ILCE-7CR	2023-09			α (Alpha)	MILC	35mm full frame (35.7 x 23.8 mm)	CMOS, Exmor R, 62.5 MP			5 axis IBIS	Real-time	1/4000 s electronic shutter	Hi: max. 8fps	1/8000 s electronic shutter		693		32,000 ISO			Articulating screen	2,359,296 dots viewfinder		2280 mAh NP-FZ100	430 g		4k video	Unlimited video duration				Multi Interface Shoe		Advanced Amateur	2023-08-29	Current
Sony α1 II	ILCE-1M2	2024-12			α (Alpha)	MILC	35mm full frame (35.7 x 23.8 mm)	BSI Stacked CMOS, Exmor RS, 50.1 MP	Touch to focus	Touch menus	5 axis IBIS	Real-time	1/8000 s	Hi: max. 30fps	1/8000 s mechanical shutter; 1/32000 s electronic shutter		759		32,000 ISO	C1, C2, C3, C4, C5, AEL, AF/MF, Rotary dial		Articulating screen	9.4M dots viewfinder		2280 mAh NP-FZ100	746 g		8k video	Unlimited video duration	4K 120fps, 1080p 240fps			Multi Interface Shoe		Flagship	2024-11-19	Current
Sony α9 III	ILCE-9M3	2024-02			α (Alpha)	MILC	35mm full frame (35.7 x 23.8 mm)	CMOS, Exmor RS, 24.60 MP with global shutter	Touch to focus	Touch menus	5 axis IBIS	Real-time			1/ 80000	120 fps	759		25,600 ISO	C1, C2, C3, C4, C5, AEL, AF/MF, Rotary dial	236	2 095 104 dots tilt-and-articulating LCD	9 437 184 dots EVF		2280 mAh NP-FZ100	702 g		4K video	Unlimited video duration	4K 120fps, 1080p 120fps			Multi interface shoe		Flagship		Current
Sony α7 V	ILCE-7M5	2025-12			α (Alpha)	MILC	35mm full frame (35.7 x 23.8 mm)	partially stacked Exmor RS™ CMOS sensor, 33.0 MP	Touch to focus	Touch menus	5-axis IBIS	Real-time					759	425																		2025-12-2	
Name	Model	Release date	Code	ID	System	Type	Format (crop f.)	Sensor	Touch to focus	Touch menus	5 axis IBIS	Eye AF	Fastest mech. shutter speed	Max FPS Cont. Shooting Mech. shutter	Fastest elec. shutter speed	Max FPS Cont. Shooting Elec. shutter	Phase Detect AF points	Contrast AF points	Max ISO in Auto modes	Custom buttons on the body	Mem. buffer	Screen	Viewfinder	Flash	Battery	Weight	Full HD Video	4k Video	Video duration limit	S&Q Slow and Quick video	DxOMark Low Light ISO	Charging	Hotshoe	Latest firmware	User level	Announce date	Availability

== List of Sony A-mount cameras ==
Name	Model	Code	ID	Type	Format	Sensor	Hotshoe	Latest firmware	User level	Announce date	Release date	Availability
Sony α900	DSLR-A900	CX85100, CX62500	257 (FF), 262 (APS-C)	DSLR	Full frame	CMOS	Auto-lock Accessory Shoe (4-pin iISO)	2.00	Professional	2008-09-09 (2007-03-08)	2008-09	Discontinued (2011-10)
Sony α850	DSLR-A850	CX86700	269 (FF), 270 (APS-C)	DSLR	Full frame	CMOS	Auto-lock Accessory Shoe (4-pin iISO)	2.00	Professional	2009-08-27	2009-09	Discontinued (2011-07)
Sony α99	SLT-A99V (with GPS), SLT-A99 (without GPS), (Hasselblad HV)	CX87500	294	SLT	Full frame	CMOS	Multi Interface Shoe	1.02	Professional	2012-09-12	2012-11	Discontinued (2016)
Sony α99 II	ILCA-99M2		354	SLT	Full frame	CMOS	Multi Interface Shoe	1.01	Professional	2016-09-19	2016-09	Discontinued (2020)
Sony α100	DSLR-A100, DSLR-A100/S (silver-colored body)	CX62100, CX62110, CX62120	256	DSLR	APS-C	CCD	Auto-lock Accessory Shoe (4-pin iISO)	1.04	Midrange	2006-06-05	2006-07	Discontinued (2008-01-05)
Sony α700	DSLR-A700 (only US-model with grip-sensor)	CX62300, CX62320	258	DSLR	APS-C	CMOS	Auto-lock Accessory Shoe (4-pin iISO)	4	Advanced	2007-09-05 (2007-03-08)	2007-09	Discontinued (2009-07)
Sony α200	DSLR-A200	CX62700	259	DSLR	APS-C	CCD	Auto-lock Accessory Shoe (4-pin iISO)	1.00	Entry level	2008-01-06	2008-01	Discontinued
Sony α300	DSLR-A300, DSLR-A300K/N (champagne gold-colored set)	CX62800	261	DSLR	APS-C	CCD	Auto-lock Accessory Shoe (4-pin iISO)	1.00	Entry level	2008-01-30	2008-01	Discontinued
Sony α350	DSLR-A350, DSLR-A350K/N (champagne gold-colored set)	CX62900	260	DSLR	APS-C	CCD	Auto-lock Accessory Shoe (4-pin iISO)	1.00	Entry level	2008-01-30	2008-01	Discontinued
Sony α230	DSLR-A230	CX85500	265	DSLR	APS-C	CCD	Auto-lock Accessory Shoe (4-pin iISO)	1.10	Entry level	2009-05-17	2009-05	Discontinued (2010-01-19)
Sony α330	DSLR-A330, DSLR-A330L/T (copper brown-colored set)	CX85200	264	DSLR	APS-C	CCD	Auto-lock Accessory Shoe (4-pin iISO)	1.10	Entry level	2009-05-17	2009-05	Discontinued (2010-05)
Sony α380	DSLR-A380	CX85600	263	DSLR	APS-C	CCD	Auto-lock Accessory Shoe (4-pin iISO)	1.10	Entry level	2009-05-17	2009-05	Discontinued (2010-05)
Sony α500	DSLR-A500	CX85700	274	DSLR	APS-C	CMOS	Auto-lock Accessory Shoe (4-pin iISO)	1.00	Midrange	2009-08-27	2009-10	Discontinued
Sony α550	DSLR-A550	CX85800	273	DSLR	APS-C	CMOS	Auto-lock Accessory Shoe (4-pin iISO)	1.00	Midrange	2009-08-27		
Sony α450	DSLR-A450	CX85900	275	DSLR	APS-C	CMOS	Auto-lock Accessory Shoe (4-pin iISO)	1.00	Midrange	2010-01-05	2010-02	Discontinued
Sony α290	DSLR-A290	CX86100	266	DSLR	APS-C	CCD	Auto-lock Accessory Shoe (4-pin iISO)	1.00	Entry level	2010-06-09	2010-06	Discontinued (2011-06-08)
Sony α390	DSLR-A390	CX86200	263	DSLR	APS-C	CCD	Auto-lock Accessory Shoe (4-pin iISO)	1.00	Entry level	2010-06-09	2010-06	Discontinued (2011-06-08)
Sony α560	DSLR-A560	CX86500	282	DSLR	APS-C	CMOS	Auto-lock Accessory Shoe (4-pin iISO)	1.00/1.11	Midrange	2010-08-24	2010-08	Discontinued (2010-11-12)
Sony α580	DSLR-A580	CX86600, CX86610	283	DSLR	APS-C	CMOS	Auto-lock Accessory Shoe (4-pin iISO)	1.00/1.11	Midrange	2010-08-24	2010-08	Discontinued (2012-03)
Sony α33	SLT-A33	CX86300, CX86310, CX86311, CX86320	280	SLT	APS-C	CMOS	Auto-lock Accessory Shoe (4-pin iISO)	2.00	Entry level	2010-08-24	2010-08	Discontinued
Sony α55	SLT-A55V (with GPS), SLT-A55 (without GPS)	CX86400, CX86410	281	SLT	APS-C	CMOS	Auto-lock Accessory Shoe (4-pin iISO)	2.00	Midrange	2010-08-24	2010-08	Discontinued
Sony α35	SLT-A35	CX86900, CX86910	285	SLT	APS-C	CMOS	Auto-lock Accessory Shoe (4-pin iISO)	1.00	Entry level	2011-06-08	2011-08	Discontinued
Sony α65	SLT-A65V (with GPS), SLT-A65 (without GPS)	CX86800, CX86810	286	SLT	APS-C	CMOS	Auto-lock Accessory Shoe (4-pin iISO)	1.07	Midrange	2011-08-24	2011-10	Discontinued
Sony α77	SLT-A77V (with GPS), SLT-A77 (without GPS)	CX87000, CX87010	287	SLT	APS-C	CMOS	Auto-lock Accessory Shoe (4-pin iISO)	1.07	Advanced	2011-08-24 (2010-02-21)	2011-10	Discontinued
Sony α57	SLT-A57	CX87400	292	SLT	APS-C	CMOS	Auto-lock Accessory Shoe (4-pin iISO)	1.04	Midrange	2012-03-13	2012-04	Discontinued
Sony α37	SLT-A37	CX87100	291	SLT	APS-C	CMOS	Auto-lock Accessory Shoe (4-pin iISO)	1.04	Entry level	2012-05-17	2012-06	Discontinued
Sony α58	SLT-A58	CX87600	303	SLT	APS-C	CMOS	Multi Interface Shoe	1.01	Midrange	2013-02-20	2013-04	Discontinued
Sony α77 II	ILCA-77M2		319	SLT	APS-C	CMOS	Multi Interface Shoe	2.00	Advanced	2014-05-01	2014-05	Discontinued (2020)
Sony α68	ILCA-68		353	SLT	APS-C	CMOS	Multi Interface Shoe	1.00	Mid-range	2015-11-05	2016-04	Discontinued (2020)

== See also ==
- List of Sony E-mount lenses
- List of Sony A-mount lenses

Level	Sensor	2004	2005	2006	2007	2008	2009	2010	2011		2012	2013	2014	2015	2016	2017	2018	2019	2020
Professional	Full frame						α900					α99				α99 II			
Professional	Full frame							α850											
High-end	APS-C		DG-7D			α700				α77				α77 II					
Midrange	APS-C									α65					α68				
Upper-entry	APS-C								α55		α57								
Upper-entry	APS-C				α100			α550 ^{F}	α580				α58						
Upper-entry	APS-C		DG-5D					α500	α560										
Upper-entry	APS-C							α450											
Entry-level	APS-C								α33	α35	α37								
Entry-level	APS-C					α350 ^{F}		α380	α390										
Entry-level	APS-C					α300		α330											
Entry-level	APS-C					α200		α230	α290										
Early models	Minolta 7000 with SB-70/SB-70S (1986) · Minolta 9000 with SB-90/SB-90S (1986) (Still video SLRs); Minolta MS-C1100 (1992) · Minolta RD-175 (1995)																		
Level	Sensor																		
Level	Sensor	2004	2005	2006	2007	2008	2009	2010	2011		2012	2013	2014	2015	2016	2017	2018	2019	2020

Family	Level	Format	'10	2011		2012	2013	2014	2015	2016	2017	2018	2019	2020	2021	2022	2023	2024	2025	2026
Alpha (α)	Indust	FF																ILX-LR1 ^{●}		
Alpha (α)	Cine line	FF													_{m} FX6 ^{●}					
Alpha (α)	Cine line	FF																		_{m} FX5 ^{AT●}
Alpha (α)	Cine line	FF													_{m} FX3 ^{AT●}					
Alpha (α)	Cine line	FF																		_{m} FX2 ^{AT●}
Alpha (α)	Flag	FF													_{m} α1 ^{FT●}				_{m} α1 II ^{FAT●}	
Alpha (α)	Speed	FF										_{m} α9 ^{FT●}			_{m} α9 II ^{FT●}				_{m} α9 III ^{FAT●}	
Alpha (α)	Sens	FF							_{m} α7S ^{●}	_{m} α7S II ^{F●}					_{m} α7S III ^{AT●}					
Alpha (α)	Hi-Res	FF						_{m} α7R ^{●}		_{m} α7R II ^{F●}		_{m} α7R III ^{FT●}		_{m} α7R IV ^{FT●}			_{m} α7R V ^{FAT●}			_{m} α7R VI ^{FAT●}
Alpha (α)	Basic	FF						_{m} α7 ^{F●}	_{m} α7 II ^{F●}				_{m} α7 III ^{FT●}			_{m} α7 IV ^{AT●}				_{m} α7 V ^{FAT●}
Alpha (α)	Compact	FF																_{m} α7CR ^{AT●}		
Alpha (α)	Compact	FF													_{m} α7C ^{AT●}			_{m} α7C II ^{AT●}		
Alpha (α)	Vlog	FF																_{m} ZV-E1 ^{AT●}		
Alpha (α)	Cine	APS-C															_{m} FX30 ^{AT●}			
Alpha (α)	Adv	APS-C			_{s} NEX-7 ^{F●}						_{m} α6500 ^{FT●}			_{m} α6600 ^{FT●}				_{m} α6700 ^{AT●}		
Alpha (α)	Mid-range	APS-C				_{m} NEX-6 ^{F●}					_{m} α6300 ^{F●}		_{m} α6400 ^{F+T●}							
Alpha (α)	Mid-range	APS-C						_{m} α6000 ^{F●}						_{m} α6100 ^{FT●}						
Alpha (α)	Vlog	APS-C														_{m} ZV-E10 ^{AT●}			_{m} ZV-E10 II ^{AT●}	
Alpha (α)	Entry-level	APS-C	NEX-5 ^{F●}	NEX-5N ^{FT●}		NEX-5R ^{F+T●}	NEX-5T ^{F+T●}		α5100 ^{F+T●}											
Alpha (α)	Entry-level	APS-C	NEX-3 ^{F●}	NEX-C3 ^{F●}		NEX-F3 ^{F+●}	NEX-3N ^{F+●}	α5000 ^{F+●}												
DSLR-style		APS-C					_{m} α3000 ^{●}		_{m} α3500 ^{●}											
SmartShot		APS-C							QX1 ^{M●}											
CineAlta	Cine line	FF										VENICE				VENICE 2				
CineAlta	Cine line	FF																BURANO		
XDCAM	Cine line	FF												_{m} FX9						
XDCAM	Docu	S35							_{m} FS7		_{m} FS7 II									
XDCAM	Mobile	S35								_{m} FS5			_{m} FS5 II							
NXCAM	Pro	S35		NEX-FS100		NEX-FS700	NEX-FS700R													
NXCAM	APS-C					NEX-EA50														
Handycam	FF					_{m} NEX-VG900														
Handycam	APS-C		_{s} NEX-VG10		_{s} NEX-VG20	_{m} NEX-VG30														
Security		FF									SNC-VB770									
Security		FF									UMC-S3C									
Family	Level	Format																		
Family	Level	Format	'10	2011		2012	2013	2014	2015	2016	2017	2018	2019	2020	2021	2022	2023	2024	2025	2026
