= Sony α5000 =

2014 APS-C mirrorless camera

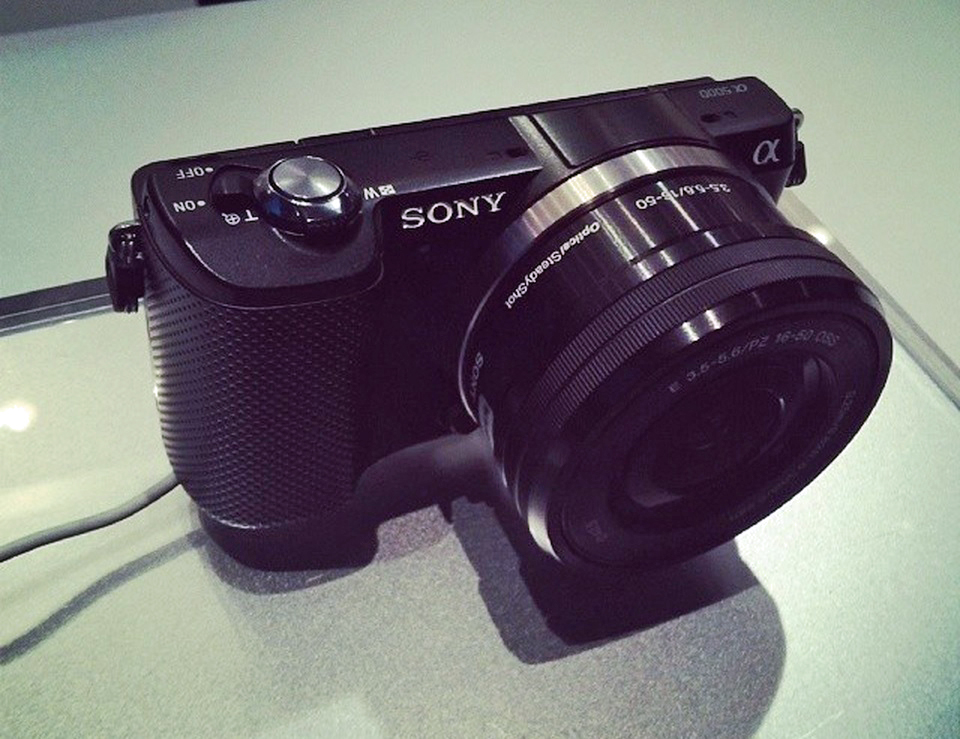
- Sony α5000 camera with 15-50mm Lens

Overview
- Maker: Sony
- Type: Digital
- Released: 2014

Lens
- Lens mount: E-mount

Sensor/medium
- Sensor: Exmor APS HD CMOS sensor
- Sensor type: CMOS
- Sensor size: 23.2 × 15.4 mm (APS-C type)
- Maximum resolution: 5456 × 3632 (20 megapixels)
- Film speed: 100-16000
- Recording medium: SD, SDHC, or SDXC memory card or Memory Stick Pro Duo
- Storage media: Memory Stick Pro Duo, SD, SDHC, SDXC

Focusing
- Focus areas: 25 focus points

Flash
- Flash: Built-in flash

Shutter
- Frame rate: 60p, 60i, 30p for video recording 3.5 fps for continuous photo shooting
- Shutter speeds: 1/4000s to 30s
- Continuous shooting: 4 frames per second

Viewfinder
- Viewfinder: No

Image processing
- Image processor: BIONZ X
- White balance: Yes

General
- LCD screen: 3 inches with 460,800 dots
- Battery: NP-FW50
- Dimensions: 110×63×36 mm (4.3×2.5×1.4 in)
- Weight: 269 g (9.5 oz) including battery
- Made in: Japan

Chronology
- Predecessor: Sony α3000
- Successor: Sony α5100

The Sony α5000 (model ILCE-5000), is a rangefinder-styled digital mirrorless system camera announced by Sony on 7 January 2014. Since it includes near field communication and Wi-Fi, Sony billed it as "the world's lightest interchangeable lens camera" with Wi-Fi. It was succeeded by the Sony α5100.

== Overview ==
The Sony ILCE-5000 features a 20.1 Megapixel Exmor APS HD CMOS Sensor for capturing pictures with high quality using the picture formats RAW and JPEG.

It can also record HD videos using the MPEG-4 format and AVCHD Progressive.

The BIONZ X image processor ensures fast processing speeds, improved noise reduction, and accurate colour reproduction.

It uses a 3-inch tilt-able LCD Screen.

The Sony Alpha 5000 (ILCE-5000 or α5000) has built-in Wi-Fi and NFC for transferring photos and videos from the camera wirelessly to a mobile device with Android or iOS installed, using the Sony Imaging Edge Mobile app.

Unlike the Sony α6000, the Sony α5000 does not feature a built-in viewfinder.

=== Specifications ===
- ISO Range: 100–16000 for versatile shooting in low light.
- Continuous Shooting: Up to 3.5 frames per second (fps).
- Viewfinder: None (uses the LCD screen for composing shots).
- Battery Life: Approximately 420 shots per charge (using the NP-FW50 battery).
- Storage: Compatible with SD, SDHC, SDXC, and Memory Stick Pro Duo cards.
- Connectivity: Micro USB, HDMI, Wi-Fi, NFC.
- Dimensions: Approximately 109.6 mm × 62.8 mm × 35.7 mm (Width × Height × Depth) (4 3/8 inches × 2 1/2 inches × 1 7/16 inches)
- Weight:
  - With battery and memory card: Approximately 269 grams (9.5 oz)
  - Body only: Approximately 210 grams (7.4 oz)

== E-Mount System ==
The Sony α5000 uses the Sony E-Mount for using Sony branded and third party lenses on the camera like many other Sony ILCE (Interchangeable Lens Camera with E-Mount) cameras.

The α5000 is compatible with all E-Mount Lenses, including APS-C and Full Frame lenses.

When using an E-Mount lens designed for a Full Frame camera, the Sony α5000 has a 1.5x crop factor, effectively narrowing the field of view

- Example: A 50mm full-frame lens will act like a 75mm lens on the A5000.
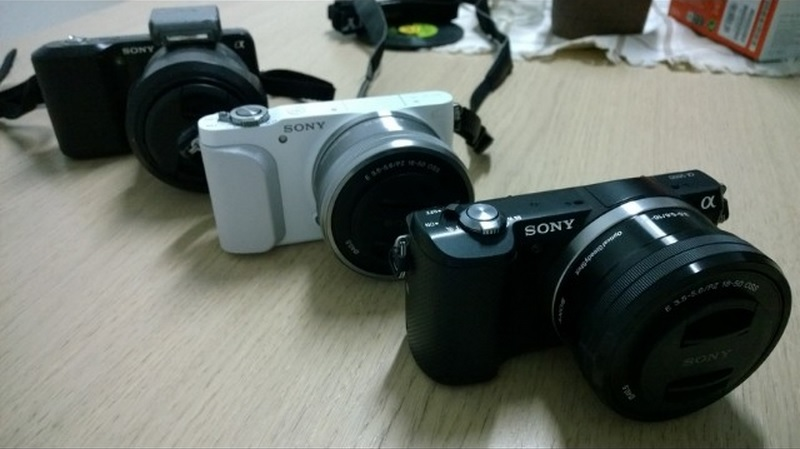
  Sony α5000 camera comparison with NEX-3N and NEX-3

== Picture Formats ==
The Sony α5000 supports shooting photos in RAW (Sony ARW 2.3), JPEG and RAW+JPEG.

- Image Sizes:
  - L (Large): 5456 x 3632 pixels (20.1 MP).
  - M (Medium): 4496 x 3000 pixels (13.5 MP).
  - S (Small): 3008 x 2000 pixels (6.0 MP).
- Aspect Ratios:
  - 3:2
  - 16:9
  - 4:3
  - 1:1

== Memory Card support ==
The Sony α5000 supports Memory Stick PRO Duo™, Memory Stick PRO-HG Duo™, Memory Stick XC-HG Duo, SD, SDHC and SDXC for storing photos and videos in the formats mentioned above (RAW, JPEG, RAW+JPEG).

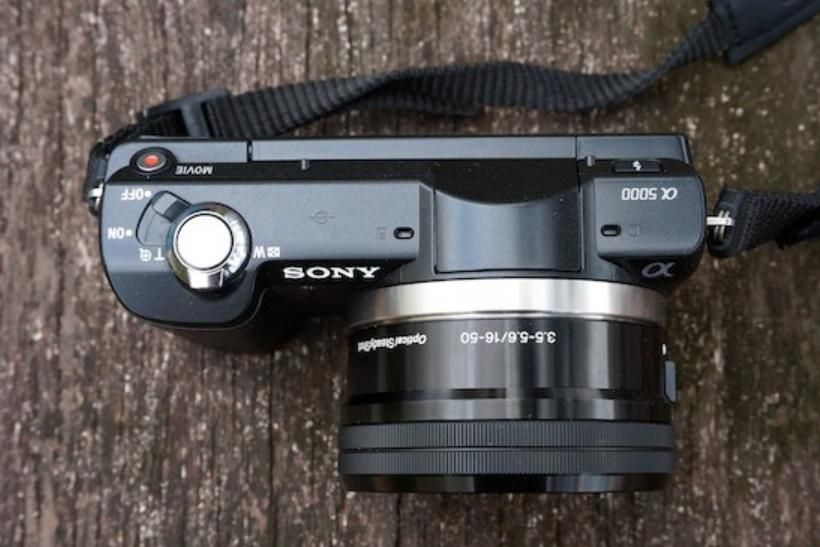
Sony A5000 with 16-50 (5)

== See also ==
- Sony α6000
- Sony α5100
- Sony NEX-5
- List of Sony α cameras
- List of Sony E-mount cameras
- List of smallest mirrorless cameras

Family	Level	Format	'10	2011		2012	2013	2014	2015	2016	2017	2018	2019	2020	2021	2022	2023	2024	2025	2026
Alpha (α)	Indust	FF																ILX-LR1 ^{●}		
Alpha (α)	Cine line	FF													_{m} FX6 ^{●}					
Alpha (α)	Cine line	FF																		_{m} FX5 ^{AT●}
Alpha (α)	Cine line	FF													_{m} FX3 ^{AT●}					
Alpha (α)	Cine line	FF																		_{m} FX2 ^{AT●}
Alpha (α)	Flag	FF													_{m} α1 ^{FT●}				_{m} α1 II ^{FAT●}	
Alpha (α)	Speed	FF										_{m} α9 ^{FT●}			_{m} α9 II ^{FT●}				_{m} α9 III ^{FAT●}	
Alpha (α)	Sens	FF							_{m} α7S ^{●}	_{m} α7S II ^{F●}					_{m} α7S III ^{AT●}					
Alpha (α)	Hi-Res	FF						_{m} α7R ^{●}		_{m} α7R II ^{F●}		_{m} α7R III ^{FT●}		_{m} α7R IV ^{FT●}			_{m} α7R V ^{FAT●}			_{m} α7R VI ^{FAT●}
Alpha (α)	Basic	FF						_{m} α7 ^{F●}	_{m} α7 II ^{F●}				_{m} α7 III ^{FT●}			_{m} α7 IV ^{AT●}				_{m} α7 V ^{FAT●}
Alpha (α)	Compact	FF																_{m} α7CR ^{AT●}		
Alpha (α)	Compact	FF													_{m} α7C ^{AT●}			_{m} α7C II ^{AT●}		
Alpha (α)	Vlog	FF																_{m} ZV-E1 ^{AT●}		
Alpha (α)	Cine	APS-C															_{m} FX30 ^{AT●}			
Alpha (α)	Adv	APS-C			_{s} NEX-7 ^{F●}						_{m} α6500 ^{FT●}			_{m} α6600 ^{FT●}				_{m} α6700 ^{AT●}		
Alpha (α)	Mid-range	APS-C				_{m} NEX-6 ^{F●}					_{m} α6300 ^{F●}		_{m} α6400 ^{F+T●}							
Alpha (α)	Mid-range	APS-C						_{m} α6000 ^{F●}						_{m} α6100 ^{FT●}						
Alpha (α)	Vlog	APS-C														_{m} ZV-E10 ^{AT●}			_{m} ZV-E10 II ^{AT●}	
Alpha (α)	Entry-level	APS-C	NEX-5 ^{F●}	NEX-5N ^{FT●}		NEX-5R ^{F+T●}	NEX-5T ^{F+T●}		α5100 ^{F+T●}											
Alpha (α)	Entry-level	APS-C	NEX-3 ^{F●}	NEX-C3 ^{F●}		NEX-F3 ^{F+●}	NEX-3N ^{F+●}	α5000 ^{F+●}												
DSLR-style		APS-C					_{m} α3000 ^{●}		_{m} α3500 ^{●}											
SmartShot		APS-C							QX1 ^{M●}											
CineAlta	Cine line	FF										VENICE				VENICE 2				
CineAlta	Cine line	FF																BURANO		
XDCAM	Cine line	FF												_{m} FX9						
XDCAM	Docu	S35							_{m} FS7		_{m} FS7 II									
XDCAM	Mobile	S35								_{m} FS5			_{m} FS5 II							
NXCAM	Pro	S35		NEX-FS100		NEX-FS700	NEX-FS700R													
NXCAM	APS-C					NEX-EA50														
Handycam	FF					_{m} NEX-VG900														
Handycam	APS-C		_{s} NEX-VG10		_{s} NEX-VG20	_{m} NEX-VG30														
Security		FF									SNC-VB770									
Security		FF									UMC-S3C									
Family	Level	Format																		
Family	Level	Format	'10	2011		2012	2013	2014	2015	2016	2017	2018	2019	2020	2021	2022	2023	2024	2025	2026
