= A580 =

A580 may refer to:

- A580 road (England)
- Canon PowerShot A580, a camera
- DSLR-A580 a.k.a. α580, a digital SLR with A-mount in the Sony Alpha camera system
