= Canon EOS 3000N =

2002 35mm single-lens reflex camera

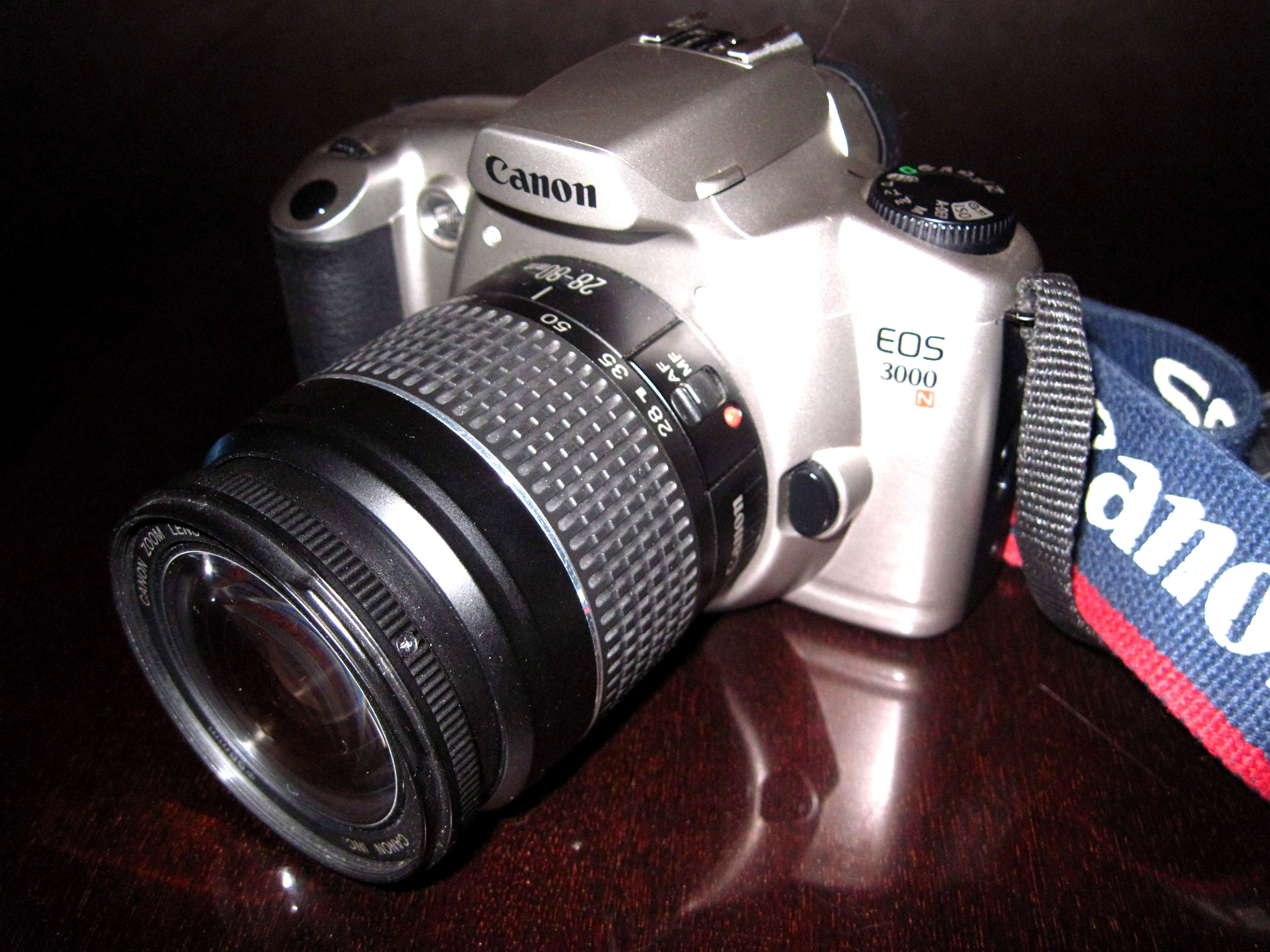
- Canon EOS 3000N with a 28–80mm lens attached

Overview
- Maker: Canon Inc.
- Type: 35mm SLR
- Released: February 2002
- Intro price: US$269.99 (equivalent to $472 in 2024)

Lens
- Lens mount: Canon EF lens mount

Sensor/medium
- Film format: 35 mm
- Film speed: ISO 6 - 6400

Focusing
- Focus: TTL-SIR phase detection autofocus

Flash
- Flash: Hot shoe

Shutter
- Shutter speeds: 1/2000 s to 30 s

Viewfinder
- Viewfinder magnification: 0.7x
- Frame coverage: 90%

General
- Battery: 2x CR123A
- Dimensions: 145 × 92 × 62 mm
- Weight: 350 g (0.77 lb) excluding battery

The Canon EOS 3000N (EOS 66 in Asia and Rebel XS N in North America) is a 35mm auto-focus single lens reflex (SLR) camera that was introduced in February 2002 as a replacement for the EOS 3000.

The camera has a QD date model that prints the date and time of the photograph onto the image.

Class	1987	1988	1989	1990	1991	1992	1993	1994	1995	1996	1997	1998	1999	2000	2001	2002	2003	2004	2005	2006	2007	…	2018
Professional				1					1N					1V									
Professional				RT					1N RS														
High-end				10			5						3										
Advanced		620		600		100				50					30				30V				
Midrange	650				1000F	1000F N		500			500N			300			300V		300X				
Entry-level		750	850	700					5000				3000			3000N		3000V					
Entry-level											IX												
Entry-level												IX 7											
