= Sony Alpha 290 =

Sony α290
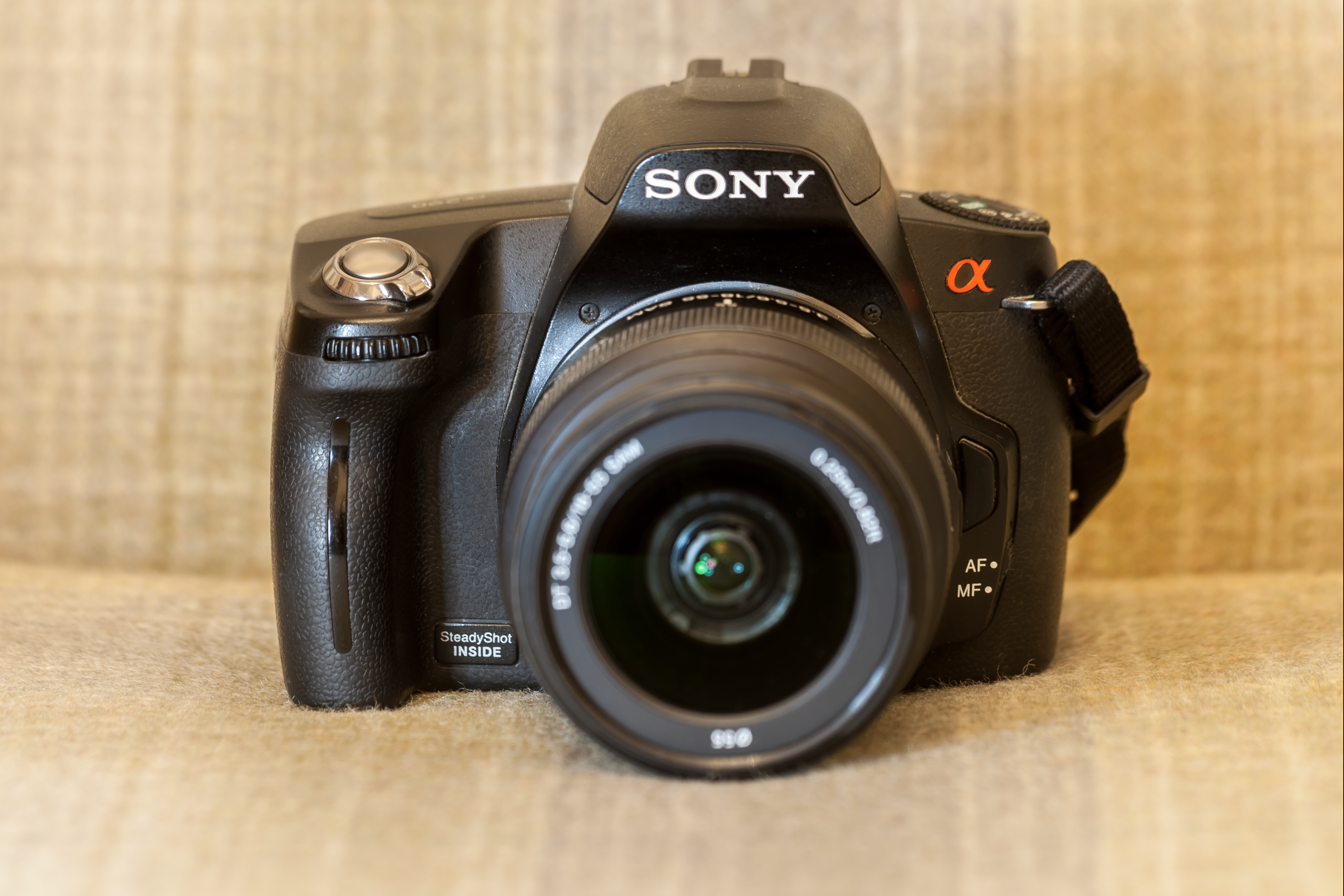

Overview
- Maker: Sony Group
- Type: Digital single-lens reflex camera

Lens
- Lens: Interchangeable, Sony α / Konica Minolta A mount

Sensor/medium
- Sensor: 14.0 effective megapixels 23.5 × 15.7 mm CCD
- Maximum resolution: 4592 × 3056 pixels
- Film speed: Auto, 100, 200, 400, 800, 1600, 3200
- Storage media: SD, SDHC, Memory Stick PRO Duo, Memory Stick PRO-HG Duo, Memory Stick PRO-HG Duo HX

Focusing
- Focus areas: 9-points, center cross-type

Flash
- Flash: Built in

Shutter
- Shutter speed range: 30s to 1/4000s (1/1 stops), including Bulb setting
- Continuous shooting: 2.5 frames per second (JPEG, JPEG+RAW, RAW)

Viewfinder
- Viewfinder: 95% coverage, 0.83x

Image processing
- White balance: 2500–9900 Kelvin

General
- LCD screen: 230.4k pixel , 2.7-inch LCD
- Battery: Lithium-ion battery pack, Model NP-FH50
- Weight: 456 g (16.1 oz) (without battery)
- Made in: Japan or Thailand

The Sony α290 (DSLR-A290) is a Sony entry-level digital single-lens reflex camera (DSLR) introduced in 2010. The 14.0 megapixel α290 is available in the United States in two kit versions, one with a DT 18-55mm SAM (smooth-autofocus-motor) Sony lens and the other with the same DT 18-55mm SAM lens and a DT 55-200mm SAM Sony lens.

The Sony α290 has a 9-point AF system and takes all Sony α/Minolta AF mount lenses. The 14.0 megapixel APS-C (23.5 mm × 15.7 mm) sized CCD sensor has a max ISO of 3200, however when using ISO 800 the photos start to get noisy and 1600 and 3200 have very bad noise. The Sony α290 has a BIONZ image processor and can take approximately 2.5 frames per second. The Sony α290 includes Creative Style, or preset color settings; BRAVIA Sync with a built in HDMI plug, and anti-dust technology. The Sony α290's anti-dust system is a charge protection coating on a low pass filter and image-sensor shift mechanism. The α290 also features Sony's SteadyShot INSIDE in-body stabilization.

The Sony α290 takes the Sony NP-FH50 rechargeable battery and can take about 500 photos on a full charge (according to Sony). The viewfinder on the Sony α290 has a 95% field of view and has .83x magnification (with a 50 mm lens at infinity) is arguably superior to its sister, the Sony α390, which is almost the same camera except its bigger-tilt screen and live preview.

A disadvantage to the Sony α290 is its proprietary hot shoe, or where an external flash unit attaches. The Sony α290, like all other Sony Alpha DSLRs, has the iISO flash shoe.

The Sony α290 officially succeeded the Sony α 230, and brought about the return of several features. It also includes a new "HELP" system, to assist new users. Like the α230, the α290 will take both a Memory Stick PRO Duo or an SD/SDHC card.

The camera weighs approximately 456 grams (16.1 oz) without the battery, memory card, lens and other accessories and has the approximate dimensions of 128 mm × 97 mm × 86 mm (W/H/D).

The Sony α290 has a standard USB 2.0 port along with its mini HDMI port. The camera sends a review image to HDMI output immediately after taking a photo. There is no need to switch to playback mode to review.

The flash on the α290 is a standard pop-up with a recycling time of approximately 4 seconds. The hot shoe is, like most other Sony Alpha camera, a proprietary iISO.

The Sony α290 has a capability to work with infrared remote control and also wired remote. Remote control is sold separately, and is enabled through the Drive mode menu by selecting 'Remote Commander'.

The Sony α290 has a capability to take power from AC Power Supply, model AC-PW10AM. This power supply is sold separately.

Level	Sensor	2004	2005	2006	2007	2008	2009	2010	2011		2012	2013	2014	2015	2016	2017	2018	2019	2020
Professional	Full frame						α900					α99				α99 II			
Professional	Full frame							α850											
High-end	APS-C		DG-7D			α700				α77				α77 II					
Midrange	APS-C									α65					α68				
Upper-entry	APS-C								α55		α57								
Upper-entry	APS-C				α100			α550 ^{F}	α580				α58						
Upper-entry	APS-C		DG-5D					α500	α560										
Upper-entry	APS-C							α450											
Entry-level	APS-C								α33	α35	α37								
Entry-level	APS-C					α350 ^{F}		α380	α390										
Entry-level	APS-C					α300		α330											
Entry-level	APS-C					α200		α230	α290										
Early models	Minolta 7000 with SB-70/SB-70S (1986) · Minolta 9000 with SB-90/SB-90S (1986) (Still video SLRs); Minolta MS-C1100 (1992) · Minolta RD-175 (1995)																		
Level	Sensor																		
Level	Sensor	2004	2005	2006	2007	2008	2009	2010	2011		2012	2013	2014	2015	2016	2017	2018	2019	2020
