= Sony Alpha 330 =

Digital single-lens reflex camera

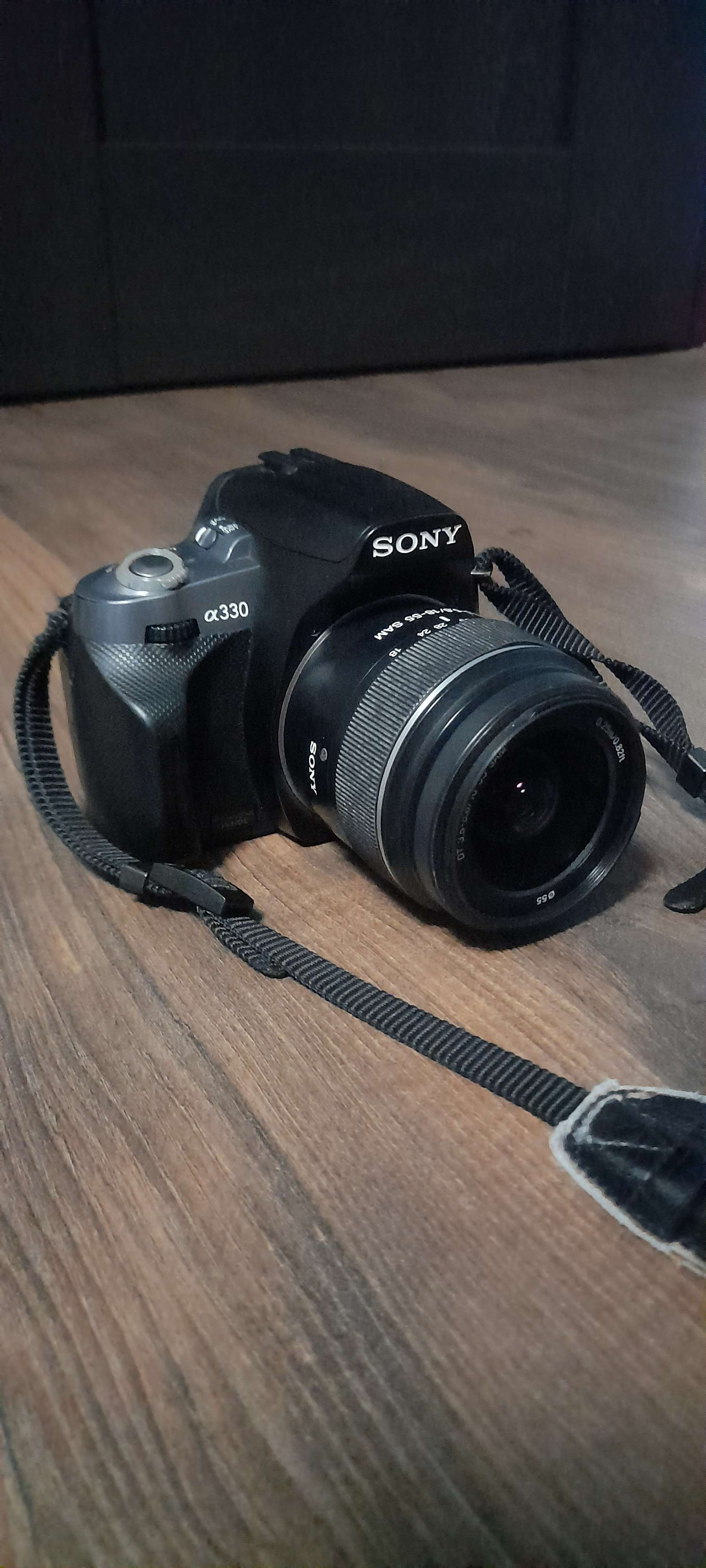

The Sony α330 (a.k.a. Sony DSLR-A330) is a 10.2 megapixel entry-level digital single-lens reflex camera released by Sony in 2009. It is equipped with a APS-C format CCD sensor, a 2.7" tiltable LCD screen, SteadyShot and 9 point autofocus. It has an ISO range of 100-3200 and a shutter speed range of 30s to 1/4000s, with RAW and JPEG support in 3872 x 2592 resolution. It supports the Memory Stick format (except Memory Stick Micro), SD and SDHC cards.

Level	Sensor	2004	2005	2006	2007	2008	2009	2010	2011		2012	2013	2014	2015	2016	2017	2018	2019	2020
Professional	Full frame						α900					α99				α99 II			
Professional	Full frame							α850											
High-end	APS-C		DG-7D			α700				α77				α77 II					
Midrange	APS-C									α65					α68				
Upper-entry	APS-C								α55		α57								
Upper-entry	APS-C				α100			α550 ^{F}	α580				α58						
Upper-entry	APS-C		DG-5D					α500	α560										
Upper-entry	APS-C							α450											
Entry-level	APS-C								α33	α35	α37								
Entry-level	APS-C					α350 ^{F}		α380	α390										
Entry-level	APS-C					α300		α330											
Entry-level	APS-C					α200		α230	α290										
Early models	Minolta 7000 with SB-70/SB-70S (1986) · Minolta 9000 with SB-90/SB-90S (1986) (Still video SLRs); Minolta MS-C1100 (1992) · Minolta RD-175 (1995)																		
Level	Sensor																		
Level	Sensor	2004	2005	2006	2007	2008	2009	2010	2011		2012	2013	2014	2015	2016	2017	2018	2019	2020
