= Multi Interface Shoe =

Sony camera mounting point

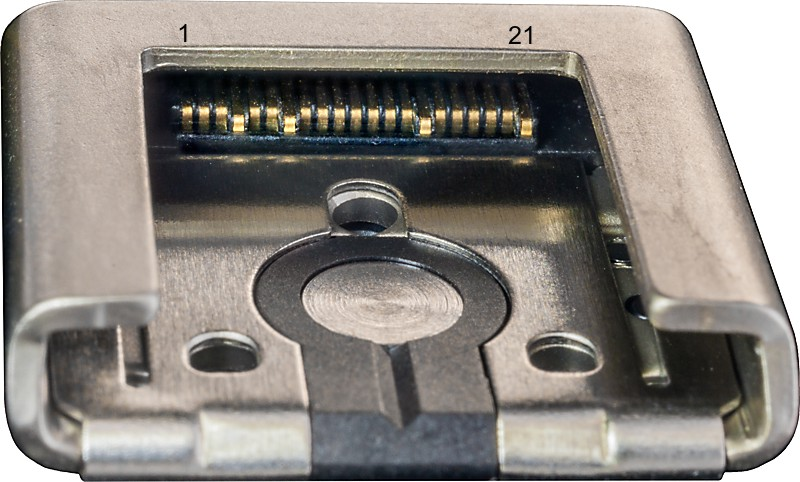
Sony mi accessory shoe

The Multi Interface Shoe (a.k.a. MI Shoe or MIS) is a proprietary camera hotshoe introduced by Sony in 2012, replacing an assortment of other proprietary hotshoes used by Sony in various types of cameras in the past.

== Overview ==
The Multi Interface Shoe is a proprietary camera hotshoe introduced by Sony on 12 September 2012, replacing an assortment of other proprietary hotshoes used by Sony in various types of cameras in the past, including the Auto-lock Accessory Shoe (a.k.a. AAS or "iISO" shoe) introduced by Minolta in 1988 and used on Sony α DSLRs, SLTs and some NEX cameras, and the Smart Accessory Terminals types 1 (SAT) and 2 (SAT2) used on the majority of the Sony α NEX-line. It also replaces Sony's former Cyber-shot hotshoe, Intelligent Accessory Shoe (IAS) and Active Interface Shoe (AIS).

At first sight, the Multi Interface Shoe resembles a standard ISO 518 hotshoe with middle contact and frame ground and without any vendor-specific extra contacts, but additional electrical contacts are hidden under the front of the hotshoe. Therefore, the hotshoe is mechanically compatible with any ISO 518-based equipment, and while it does not allow to control third-party flashes, ISO-based flashes can be triggered at least. The hotshoe also features three holes in its metal base in order to support an optional locking mechanism in the flash or other hotshoe device. It does not, however, provide an auto-locking mechanism as on the Auto-lock Accessory Shoe.

Electrically, the Multi Interface Shoe includes all signals of both the Auto-lock Accessory Shoe and the Smart Accessory Terminal 2, thereby allowing passive electromechanical adapters to be used. For this purpose, Sony provides ADP-MAA (top: Auto-lock, bottom: MIS) and ADP-AMA (top: MIS, bottom: Auto-lock) adapters. Both adapters route through the "F2" and "F3" signals; the Auto-lock hotshoe's "F1" signal is connected to the middle contact of the Multi Interface shoe, not pin 20 ("F1#"), which is left open. MIS pins 7 and 15 ("REG_GND") are internally connected to both sides of the frame as well as to the GND signal of the Auto-lock shoe's side. "MIC_GND" pin 4 is left open.

The ADP-AMA's Auto-lock hotshoe features a switch, which shorts MIS pin 21 ("PGND") to "GND" when the adapter is mounted on a hotshoe without hole (as on a camera, or with ADP-MAA or FS-1200). Otherwise pin 21 is left open in the adapter (indicating wired or remote use). Assuming that pin 21 is tied to PGND in a camera's hotshoe, this allows flashes compatible with the Multi Interface Shoe to detect if they are mounted on the camera or not as it is necessary for ADI to work.

In the ADP-MAA adapter, pins 2 and 3 ("ID2" and "ID1") are directly connected to GND, whereas pin 1 ("ID3") is pulled low via a 470 kΩ resistor.

The first cameras to use the Multi Interface Shoe are the SLT-A99, NEX-6, NEX-VG900, NEX-VG30, DSC-RX1 and DSC-HX50. It is also used on all newer cameras including the ILCA-series and ILCE-series. In 2014, the Hasselblad HV has become the first third-party camera to support the Multi Interface Shoe as well.

In 2013, Sony released a third hotshoe adapter, named ADP-MAC. It allows to mount equipment with Active Interface Shoe onto cameras with Multi Interface Shoe.

The Multi Interface Shoe was integrated into the existing Minolta/Sony TTL flash cable system by the introduction of the flash shoe FA-CS1M (VX9371), a remote hotshoe with four-pin TTL cable port and a Multi Interface Shoe on its top and bottom.

== Electronic contacts ==
Pin	Direction (shoe)	Type	Signal	AAS	SAT / (only SAT2)	Comment
1	In	Generic	ID3	N/A	N/A	Hotshoe type identification (left-most pin, except for pin 23)
2	In	Generic	ID2	N/A	ID2	Hotshoe type identification
3	In	Generic	ID1	N/A	ID1	Hotshoe type identification
4	Supply (out)	Microphone or EVF	MIC_GND	N/A	MIC_GND	Microphone ground (analog)
5	In / Out	Microphone or EVF	MIC_L / GVIF_SDATA_N	N/A	MIC_L / (GVIF_SDATA_N)	Left microphone (analog), EVF
6	In / Out	Microphone or EVF	MIC_R / GVIF_SDATA_P	N/A	MIC_R / (GVIF_SDATA_P)	Right microphone (analog), EVF
7	Supply (out)	Power	REG_GND	GND	REG_GND	Logic ground – connected to pins 15, 23, 24 in camera
8	Out / Out	GPS or WLAN	GPS_PWR_CTRL / WLAN_SD_CLK	N/A	N/A	
9	Out / Out	GPS or WLAN	GPS_CTS / WLAN_SD_D0	N/A	N/A	
10	In / Out	GPS or WLAN	GPS_RTS / WLAN_SD_D1	N/A	N/A	
11	Out / Out	GPS or WLAN	GPS_UART_TXD / WLAN_SD_D2	N/A	N/A	
12	In / Out	GPS or WLAN	GPS_UART_RXD / WLAN_SD_D3	N/A	N/A	
13	Supply (out)	Power	LOGIC_VDD		LOGIC_VDD	Switched, regulated low-power 3.15 V supply
14	In / Out / Out / Out	Microphone or WLAN or audio	MIC_C / WLAN_SD_CMD / SP_OUT / AUDIO_L	N/A	MIC_C	Center microphone (analog), WLAN, ?, Left audio lineout (analog)
15	Supply (out)	Power	REG_GND	GND	REG_GND	Logic ground – connected to pins 7, 23, 24 in camera
16	Out / Out / Out	GPS or WLAN or audio	XGPS_RST / XWLAN_RST / AUDIO_R	N/A	N/A	GPS Reset, WLAN Reset, Right audio lineout (analog)
17	Supply (out)	Power	UNREG		UNREG	Switched, fused (1.6 A), unregulated battery power (battery plus, 6.1–8.4 V) against pin 21
18	Out / Out	Flash or EVF	F3 / EXT_EVF_SCK	F3	F3 / (EXT_EVF_SCK)	
19	InOut / Out	Flash or EVF	F2 / EXT_EVF_SI	F2	F2 / (EXT_EVF_SI)	
20	Out / Out	Flash or EVF	F1# / EXT_EVF_SO	N/A	F1# / (EXT_EVF_SO)	
21	Supply (out)	Power	PGND		PGND	Power ground (battery minus) / on-camera detection (right-most pin, except for pin 24)
22	Open collector/Drain (out)	Flash	ISO_SHOE_X	F1	N/A	ISO shoe X sync (middle contact) – for low-voltage trigger circuits only
23	Power / Supply	Flash	ISO_SHOE_FG	GND		ISO shoe frame ground (left) - connected to pins 24, 7, 15 in camera
24	Power / Supply	Flash	ISO_SHOE_FG	GND		ISO shoe frame ground (right) – connected to pins 23, 7, 15 in camera
