= Sony α5100 =

2014 APS-C mirrorless camera

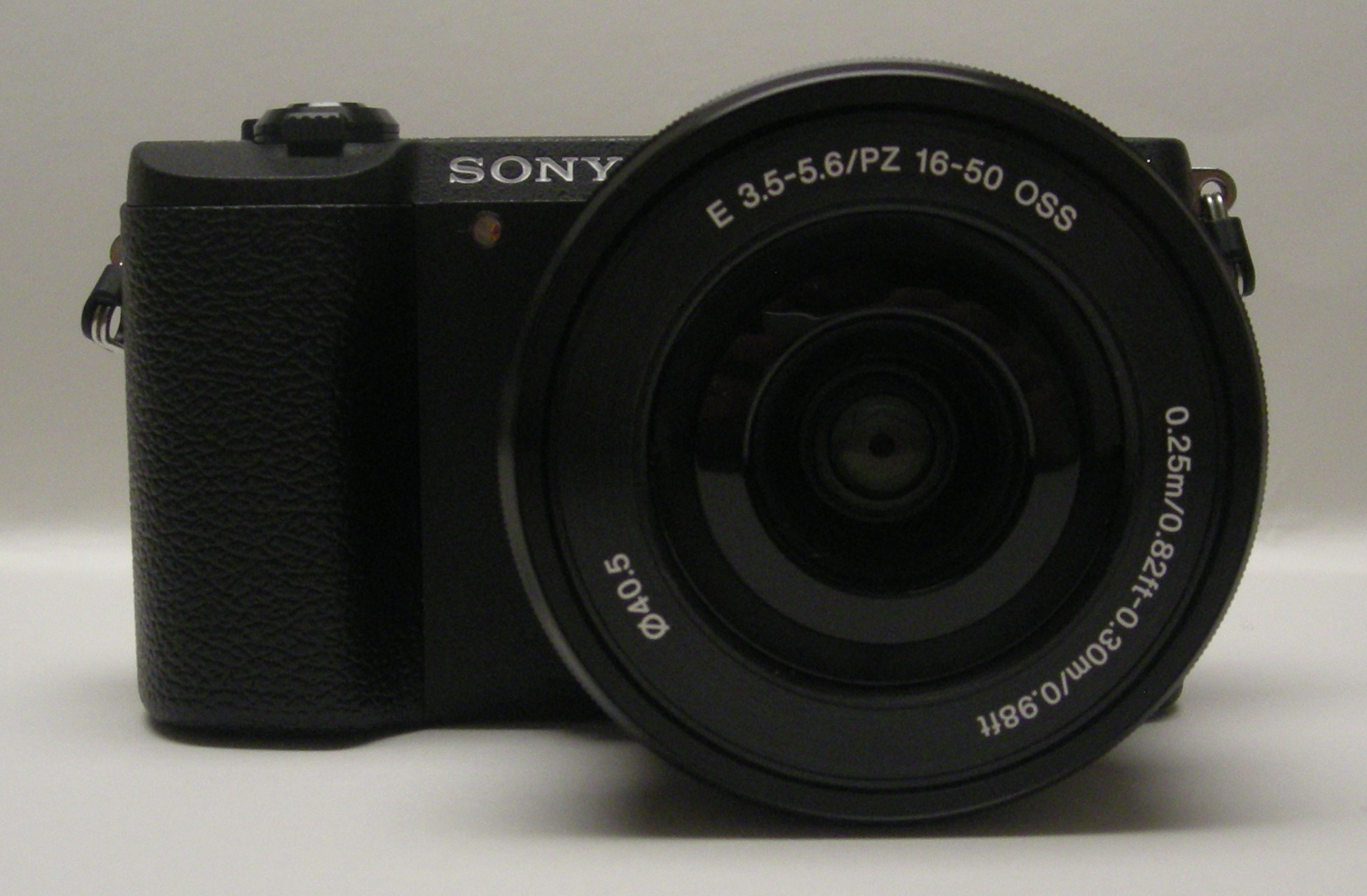

Overview
- Maker: Sony

Lens
- Lens mount: Sony E-mount

Sensor/medium
- Sensor type: CMOS rolling shutter
- Sensor size: 23.5 × 15.6 mm (APS-C type)
- Maximum resolution: 6000 × 4000 (24 megapixels)
- Film speed: 100-25600
- Recording medium: SD/SDHC/SDXC, Memory Stick Pro Duo/Pro-HG Duo

Focusing
- Focus areas: 179 focus points

Shutter
- Shutter speeds: 1/4000 s to 30 s
- Continuous shooting: 6 frames per second

Image processing
- Image processor: BIONZ X
- White balance: Yes

General
- LCD screen: 3 inches with 921,600 dots
- Dimensions: 110 × 63 × 36 mm (4.33 × 2.48 × 1.42 inches)
- Weight: 283 g (10 oz) including battery

The Sony α5100 (model ILCE-5100) is a digital mirrorless camera announced by Sony on 18 August 2014.

== Reception ==
The camera has been well-received because of its performance and its features.

== Drawbacks and missing features ==
One of the main drawbacks is the fake shutter sound that the camera emits when taking a photo, something that many reviewers noted that worsens the experience of taking photos, as the sound cannot be turned off. This fake shutter sound can be clearly heard when shooting at 1/10 or slower, at faster speeds it is either not emitted or the sound appears to blend in with the mechanical rear curtain shutter sound. This fake shutter sound is probably present in order to indicate to the camera user that the exposure has started, most likely to mimic a mechanical front curtain, as most Sony cameras now have electronic front curtains.
Missing from this camera model is a dedicated physical Fn button, standard for most Sony mirrorless cameras. The programmable function menu that can be assigned to one of the programmable buttons, similar to older Sony NEX camera models, is not available.

== See also ==
- List of Sony E-mount cameras
- List of smallest mirrorless cameras

Family	Level	Format	'10	2011		2012	2013	2014	2015	2016	2017	2018	2019	2020	2021	2022	2023	2024	2025	2026
Alpha (α)	Indust	FF																ILX-LR1 ^{●}		
Alpha (α)	Cine line	FF													_{m} FX6 ^{●}					
Alpha (α)	Cine line	FF																		_{m} FX5 ^{AT●}
Alpha (α)	Cine line	FF													_{m} FX3 ^{AT●}					
Alpha (α)	Cine line	FF																		_{m} FX2 ^{AT●}
Alpha (α)	Flag	FF													_{m} α1 ^{FT●}				_{m} α1 II ^{FAT●}	
Alpha (α)	Speed	FF										_{m} α9 ^{FT●}			_{m} α9 II ^{FT●}				_{m} α9 III ^{FAT●}	
Alpha (α)	Sens	FF							_{m} α7S ^{●}	_{m} α7S II ^{F●}					_{m} α7S III ^{AT●}					
Alpha (α)	Hi-Res	FF						_{m} α7R ^{●}		_{m} α7R II ^{F●}		_{m} α7R III ^{FT●}		_{m} α7R IV ^{FT●}			_{m} α7R V ^{FAT●}			_{m} α7R VI ^{FAT●}
Alpha (α)	Basic	FF						_{m} α7 ^{F●}	_{m} α7 II ^{F●}				_{m} α7 III ^{FT●}			_{m} α7 IV ^{AT●}				_{m} α7 V ^{FAT●}
Alpha (α)	Compact	FF																_{m} α7CR ^{AT●}		
Alpha (α)	Compact	FF													_{m} α7C ^{AT●}			_{m} α7C II ^{AT●}		
Alpha (α)	Vlog	FF																_{m} ZV-E1 ^{AT●}		
Alpha (α)	Cine	APS-C															_{m} FX30 ^{AT●}			
Alpha (α)	Adv	APS-C			_{s} NEX-7 ^{F●}						_{m} α6500 ^{FT●}			_{m} α6600 ^{FT●}				_{m} α6700 ^{AT●}		
Alpha (α)	Mid-range	APS-C				_{m} NEX-6 ^{F●}					_{m} α6300 ^{F●}		_{m} α6400 ^{F+T●}							
Alpha (α)	Mid-range	APS-C						_{m} α6000 ^{F●}						_{m} α6100 ^{FT●}						
Alpha (α)	Vlog	APS-C														_{m} ZV-E10 ^{AT●}			_{m} ZV-E10 II ^{AT●}	
Alpha (α)	Entry-level	APS-C	NEX-5 ^{F●}	NEX-5N ^{FT●}		NEX-5R ^{F+T●}	NEX-5T ^{F+T●}		α5100 ^{F+T●}											
Alpha (α)	Entry-level	APS-C	NEX-3 ^{F●}	NEX-C3 ^{F●}		NEX-F3 ^{F+●}	NEX-3N ^{F+●}	α5000 ^{F+●}												
DSLR-style		APS-C					_{m} α3000 ^{●}		_{m} α3500 ^{●}											
SmartShot		APS-C							QX1 ^{M●}											
CineAlta	Cine line	FF										VENICE				VENICE 2				
CineAlta	Cine line	FF																BURANO		
XDCAM	Cine line	FF												_{m} FX9						
XDCAM	Docu	S35							_{m} FS7		_{m} FS7 II									
XDCAM	Mobile	S35								_{m} FS5			_{m} FS5 II							
NXCAM	Pro	S35		NEX-FS100		NEX-FS700	NEX-FS700R													
NXCAM	APS-C					NEX-EA50														
Handycam	FF					_{m} NEX-VG900														
Handycam	APS-C		_{s} NEX-VG10		_{s} NEX-VG20	_{m} NEX-VG30														
Security		FF									SNC-VB770									
Security		FF									UMC-S3C									
Family	Level	Format																		
Family	Level	Format	'10	2011		2012	2013	2014	2015	2016	2017	2018	2019	2020	2021	2022	2023	2024	2025	2026
