= Sony Alpha 68 =

Sony SLT-A68
Overview
- Maker: Sony

Lens
- Lens mount: Sony/Minolta Alpha
- F-numbers: f/4,f/5.6

Sensor/medium
- Sensor type: CMOS
- Sensor size: 23.5 x 15.6mm (APS-C type)
- Maximum resolution: 6000 x 4000 (24 megapixels)
- Film speed: 100-25600
- Recording medium: SD, SDHC or SDXC memory card or Memory Stick Pro Duo

Focusing
- Focus: Auto focus
- Focus modes: Manual focus/Auto focus
- Focus areas: 79 focus points

Flash
- Flash: Built in

Shutter
- Shutter: Electronic Shutter
- Shutter speeds: 1/4000s to 30s, BULB
- Continuous shooting: 8 frames per second

Viewfinder
- Viewfinder: Electronic Viewfinder
- Viewfinder magnification: 0.88
- Frame coverage: 100%

Image processing
- Image processor: Bionz X
- White balance: Yes

General
- LCD screen: 2.7 inches with 460,800 dots
- Battery: NP-FM500H compatible
- Dimensions: 143 x 104 x 81mm (5.63 x 4.09 x 3.19 inches)
- Weight: 610 g (22 oz) including battery

The Sony Alpha 68 or Sony ILCA-68(named internally; ILCA- although coming from the "Sony SLT camera" line of cameras) is a mid-size DSLT camera announced by Sony on November 5, 2015 and available for purchase starting April 2016 (US) and March 2016 (Europe). Sony markets it as having "4D FOCUS" for fast, accurate tracking autofocus".

Camera packages named with additional letter K ship with the 18–55 mm and 18–135 mm Zoom Lens in a kit, similar to model/kit variants of the SLT-A58Y and SLT-A58K.

== Specifications ==
24.2 MP APS-C Exmor CMOS sensor. "4D" focus system as introduced on the α77 II, Bionz X and more efficient XAVC S codec HD video encoding at a higher framerate (1080/30p vs. 1080/24p on previous models). ISO ranges from 100 to 12800 (in video) and 25600 (in still image mode). Video resolution is limited to 1080p60.

Level	Sensor	2004	2005	2006	2007	2008	2009	2010	2011		2012	2013	2014	2015	2016	2017	2018	2019	2020
Professional	Full frame						α900					α99				α99 II			
Professional	Full frame							α850											
High-end	APS-C		DG-7D			α700				α77				α77 II					
Midrange	APS-C									α65					α68				
Upper-entry	APS-C								α55		α57								
Upper-entry	APS-C				α100			α550 ^{F}	α580				α58						
Upper-entry	APS-C		DG-5D					α500	α560										
Upper-entry	APS-C							α450											
Entry-level	APS-C								α33	α35	α37								
Entry-level	APS-C					α350 ^{F}		α380	α390										
Entry-level	APS-C					α300		α330											
Entry-level	APS-C					α200		α230	α290										
Early models	Minolta 7000 with SB-70/SB-70S (1986) · Minolta 9000 with SB-90/SB-90S (1986) (Still video SLRs); Minolta MS-C1100 (1992) · Minolta RD-175 (1995)																		
Level	Sensor																		
Level	Sensor	2004	2005	2006	2007	2008	2009	2010	2011		2012	2013	2014	2015	2016	2017	2018	2019	2020
