= Hot shoe =

Mounting point on top of a camera to attach a flash unit

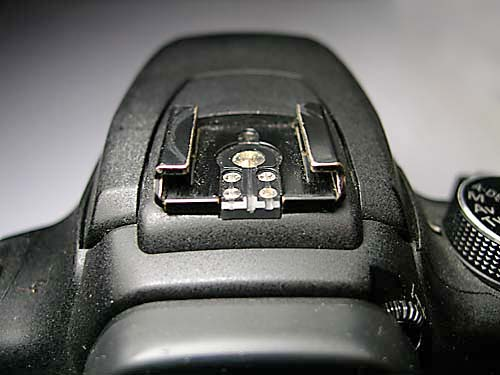
Canon EOS 350D Hot shoe

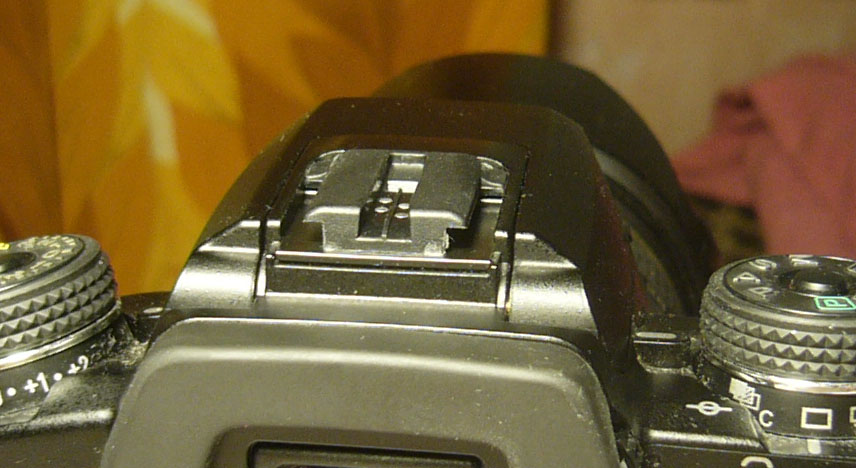
Proprietary hot shoe used by Minolta and older Sony cameras (Konica Minolta Maxxum 7D)

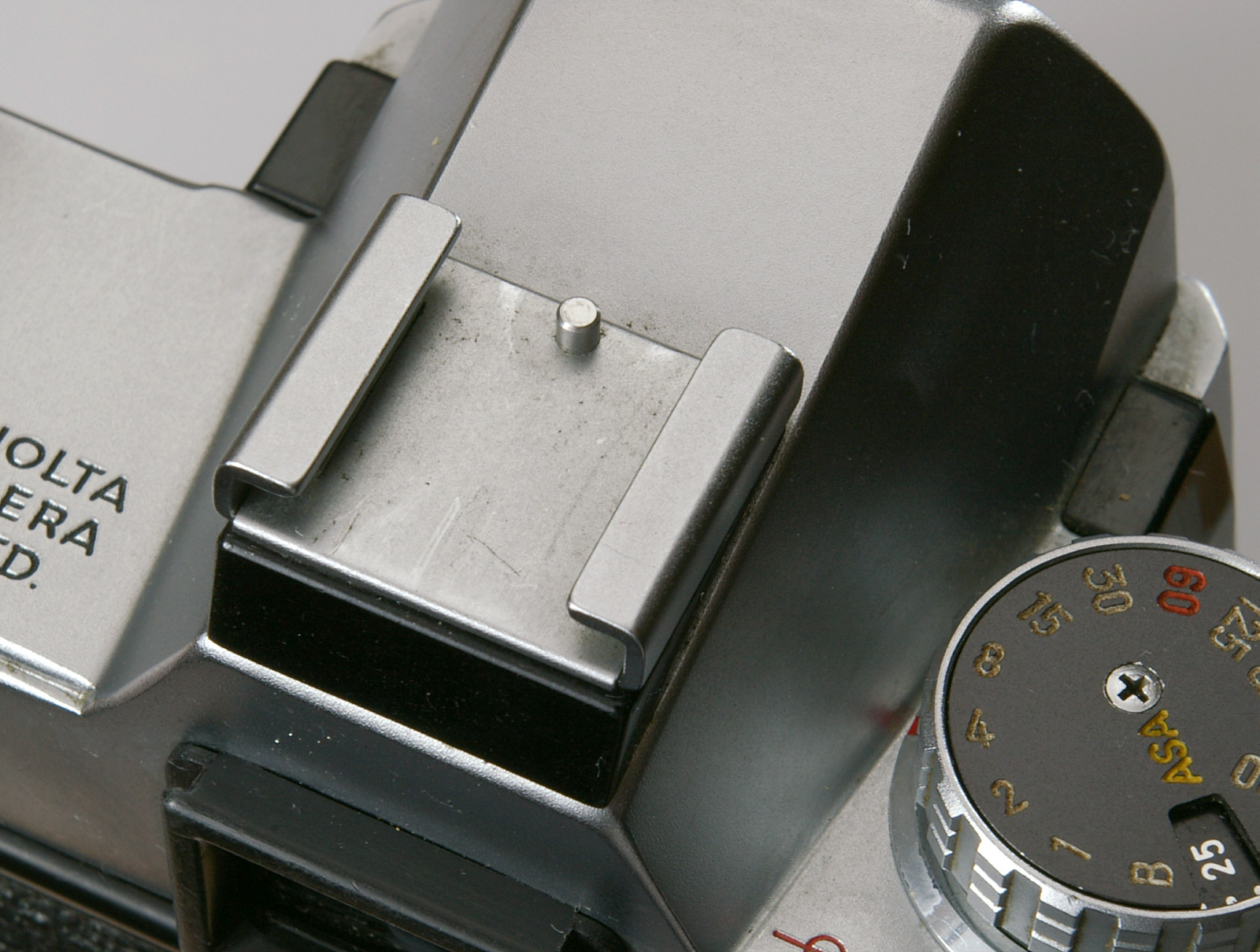
Minolta SRT101 accessory shoe without electrical function (cold shoe)

A hot shoe is a mounting point on the top of a camera to attach a flash unit and other compatible accessories. It takes the form of an angled metal bracket surrounding a metal contact point which completes an electrical connection between camera and accessory for standard, brand-independent flash synchronization.

The hot shoe is a development of the standardised "accessory shoe" or "cold shoe", with no flash contacts, formerly fitted to cameras to hold accessories such as a rangefinder, or flash connected by a cable.

The dimensions of the hot shoe are defined by the International Organization for Standardization (ISO) in ISO 518:2006. Details such as trigger voltage are not standardised; electrical incompatibilities are still possible between brands.

== Design ==
The hot shoe is shaped somewhat like an inverted, squared-off "U" of metal. The matching adapter on the bottom of the flash unit slides in from the back of the camera and is sometimes secured by a clamping screw or sliding clamp on the flash. In the center of the "U" is a metal contact point. This is used for standard, brand-independent flash synchronization. Normally the metal of the shoe and the metal of the contact are electrically isolated from each other. To fire the flash, these two pieces are connected together. The flash unit sets up a circuit between shoe and contact—when it is completed by the camera, the flash fires.

In addition to the central contact point, many cameras have additional metal contacts within the "U" of the hot shoe. These are proprietary connectors that allow for more communication between the camera and a "dedicated flash". A dedicated flash can communicate information about its power rating to the camera, set camera settings automatically, transmit color temperature data about the emitted light, and can be commanded to light a focus-assist light or fire a lower-powered pre-flash for focus-assist, metering assist or red-eye effect reduction.

The physical dimensions of the "standard hot shoe" are defined by the International Organization for Standardization in ISO 518:2006, the second edition of the standard, which replaced ISO 518:1977 and was last reviewed and confirmed in 2025.

The internal dimensions are 18.6 mm (+0.2-0) x 16.0 mm (+3-2) x 2 mm (+0.15-0), while the spacing between the two "teeth" of the shoe is 12.5 mm (+0.4-0). The external dimensions aren't standardized, but measured on a Nikon D3400 are 20.7 mm x 18 mm x 5.1 mm. Most hotshoes possess leaf springs under the "teeth".

== History and use ==
Before the 1970s, many cameras had an "accessory shoe" intended to hold accessories including flashes that connected electrically via a cable, external light meters, special viewfinders, or rangefinders. These earlier accessory shoes were of standard shape and had no electrical contacts; contacts were added to produce the hot shoe.

Canon, Nikon, Olympus, and Pentax use the standard ISO hot shoe with various proprietary electronic extensions.

In 1988 Minolta switched to use a 4-pin proprietary slide-on auto-lock "iISO" connector. A compatible 7-pin variant, which allows battery-less accessories to be powered by the camera's battery were also made, but not widely used. Konica Minolta and Sony Alpha digital SLR cameras are based on Minolta designs and used the same connector, officially named Auto-lock Accessory Shoe, as well up to 2012. Since the electrical protocol remained mostly compatible, TTL and non-TTL adapters exist to adapt ISO-based flashes to iISO hotshoes and vice versa.

Sony also used a variety of other proprietary hotshoes for other digital cameras, including the ISO-based 6-pin Cyber-shot hotshoe, the 16-pin Active Interface Shoe (AIS) and the ISO-based 16-pin Intelligent Accessory Shoe (IAS). Some of their NEX cameras used a proprietary Smart Accessory Terminal (versions 1 and 2). In September 2012, Sony announced a new ISO-based 21+3 pin Multi Interface Shoe for use with their future digital cameras of the Alpha, NEX, Handycam, NXCAM and Cyber-shot series. This quick-lock hotshoe is mechanically and electrically compatible with a standard 2-pin ISO-518 hotshoe, but electrically compatible with the previous Auto-lock Accessory Shoe with extensions, so that passive adapters ADP-AMA and ADP-MAA allow the use of digital-ready iISO flashes on new cameras and some new Multi Interface Shoe equipment on older cameras, while providing compatibility with standard ISO-based equipment as well.

Canon uses a non-ISO-based 13+1 pin hot shoe, named Mini Advanced Shoe on some of its camcorders. In 2021 Canon introduced a Multi-Function Shoe with the EOS R3 camera; besides flash units, it supplies power to accessories such as the Speedlite Transmitter ST-E10 and the DM-E1D directional stereo microphone, and the Multi-Function Shoe Adapter AD-E1 maintains weather resistance when existing Speedlites are used.

== Voltages ==
An internal camera circuit connects the center contact and shoe mount to trigger the flash. The magnitude and polarity of the voltage between the contacts on the flash in the open-circuit condition has varied between different flash units; this is of no consequence for a simple electromechanical contact on the camera so long as the energy is not so high as to damage the contacts. However, with more recent cameras with electronic triggering, excessive or insufficient voltage, or incorrect polarity can cause failure to fire, or damage the camera.

The ISO 10330 specification allows for a trigger voltage of 24 volts. Some manufacturers, particularly Canon, ask for no more than 6 volts. Flash units designed for modern cameras use voltages which are safe and effective, but some older flashes have much higher voltages, up to hundreds of volts, which damage electronic triggering circuits. Some use negative DC polarity, or AC.

iISO hotshoe contacts are only protected up to ca. 5 volts in some cameras. Minolta documented all their cameras' electronically controlled PC terminals and ISO hot shoes to be protected up to 400 volts.

It is possible to connect an older high-voltage triggering flash to a camera which can only tolerate 5 or 6 volts through an adaptor containing the necessary voltage protection circuitry, typically using a high power TRIAC. Such adapters drain power from the flash's trigger voltage and therefore often do not need a power supply of their own.

In order to avoid dangerous loops when connecting equipment in complex studio setups, better adapters offer voltage protection and galvanic isolation of the units. Such adapters will ensure that there is no electrical connection of any kind between both sides of the adapter, including ground. They use either transformers or opto-couplers to transfer a safe trigger impulse from the camera to the flash. They are powered by batteries, as their electronics cannot be powered from the flash. As an example, Minolta offered the PC terminal adapter PCT-100 (8825-691) for this purpose, which worked as a galvanic isolator and could withstand 400 volts DC or AC. The similar Sony flash sync terminal and ISO hotshoe adapters FA-ST1AM and FA-HS1AM also offer galvanic isolation as well, but only up to 60 volts DC or AC.

Flash servos and radio triggers, e.g. PocketWizard, can also provide electrical isolation, as trigger and receiver unit are physically separate. The camera is only presented with the low voltage used by the local trigger unit, and the remote receiver unit is designed to tolerate up to 200 volts from its flash port. Slave flash, where the flash from a safe flash unit connected to the camera triggers an unconnected flashgun which, if connected, would present a dangerous voltage, is another way to use a flashgun which cannot be connected to a hot shoe; indeed, it can be used for a camera with built-in flash and no hot shoe.

The trigger voltages provided by some modern flashes or radio triggers can also be too low to reliably trigger electronic circuits in the camera or receiver. Trigger circuit voltages below ca. 2 to 2.5 volts may exhibit this problem, unless the triggering circuit is specifically designed to work with such low voltages.

Older cameras equipped with an electro-mechanical trigger contact may exhibit yet another problem. If they provide both an ISO hotshoe and a PC terminal, both are typically wired to the same trigger contact in the camera rather than triggered independently as in cameras with electronic triggering circuits. When only the PC terminal is used and nothing is connected to the hotshoe, a flash with high trigger circuit voltages connected to the PC terminal delivers this voltage on the normally unprotected middle contact of the camera's ISO hotshoe. If the photographer's eyebrows accidentally make contact with the middle contact, the electrical shock can cause pain or even injuries. One way camera manufacturers have used to avoid this problem was to use two independent trigger contacts, which, however, could cause flash synchronization problems. Another, as utilized by Minolta in all such cameras supporting a PC terminal, was to add a small switch on the side of the ISO hotshoe which disabled the middle contact until something was inserted into the hotshoe.

== Modern cold shoes and other devices ==
There is still a need for accessory shoes without electrical function (cold shoes). They are used with off-camera flash units, mounted on stands and connected to the camera by cable or triggered wirelessly. Accessories which do not connect electrically to the camera can be inserted into hot shoes, without using the contacts. For instance a stereo microphone or electronic viewfinder can be used in the Olympus XZ-1 camera's hot shoe.
