= IISO flash shoe =

Flash shoe

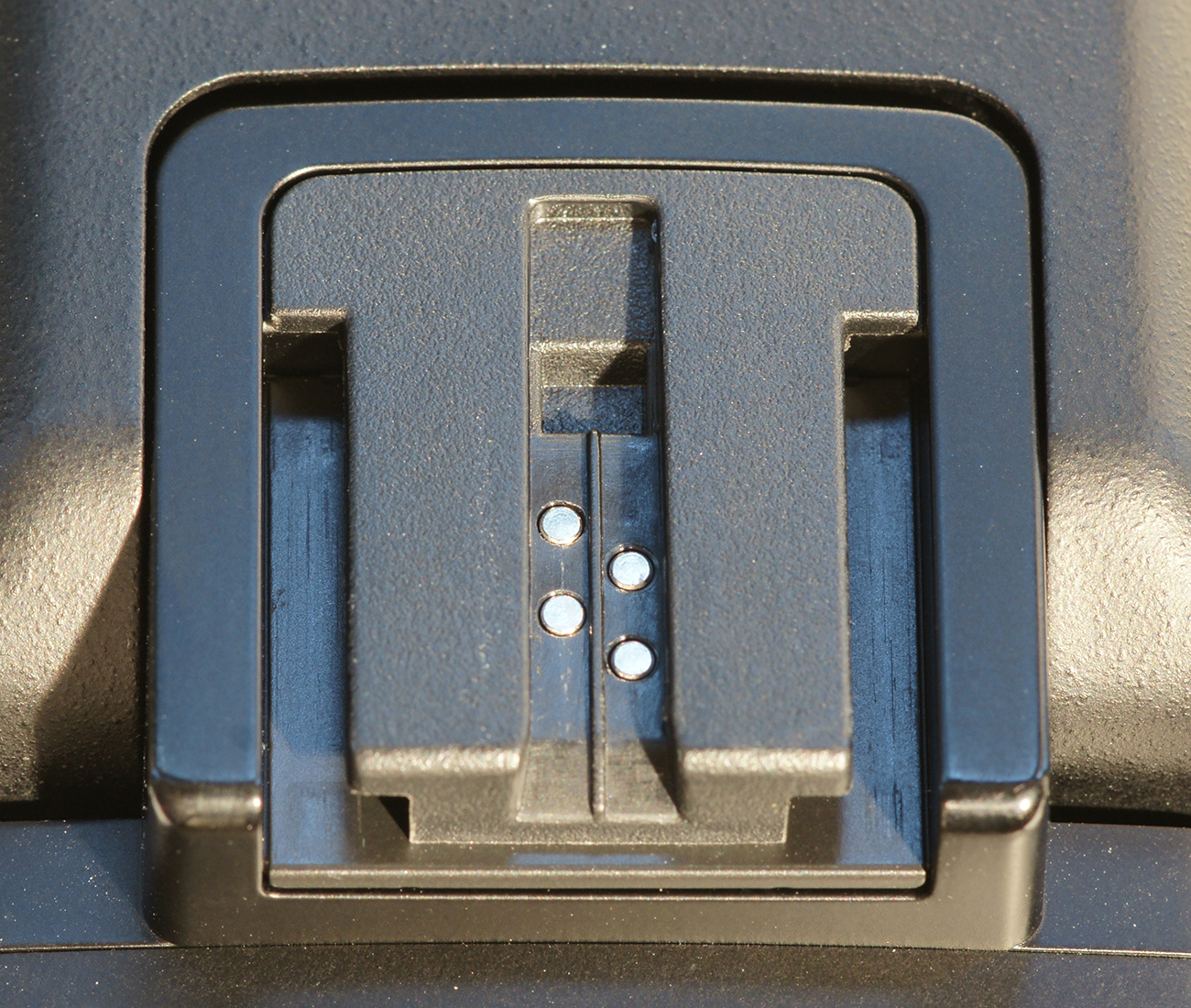
Minolta/Sony iISO flash shoe - Minolta Maxxum 9 specimen pictured

Pre-1985 Minolta ISO 518 hot-shoe - Minolta X-500/X-570 specimen pictured

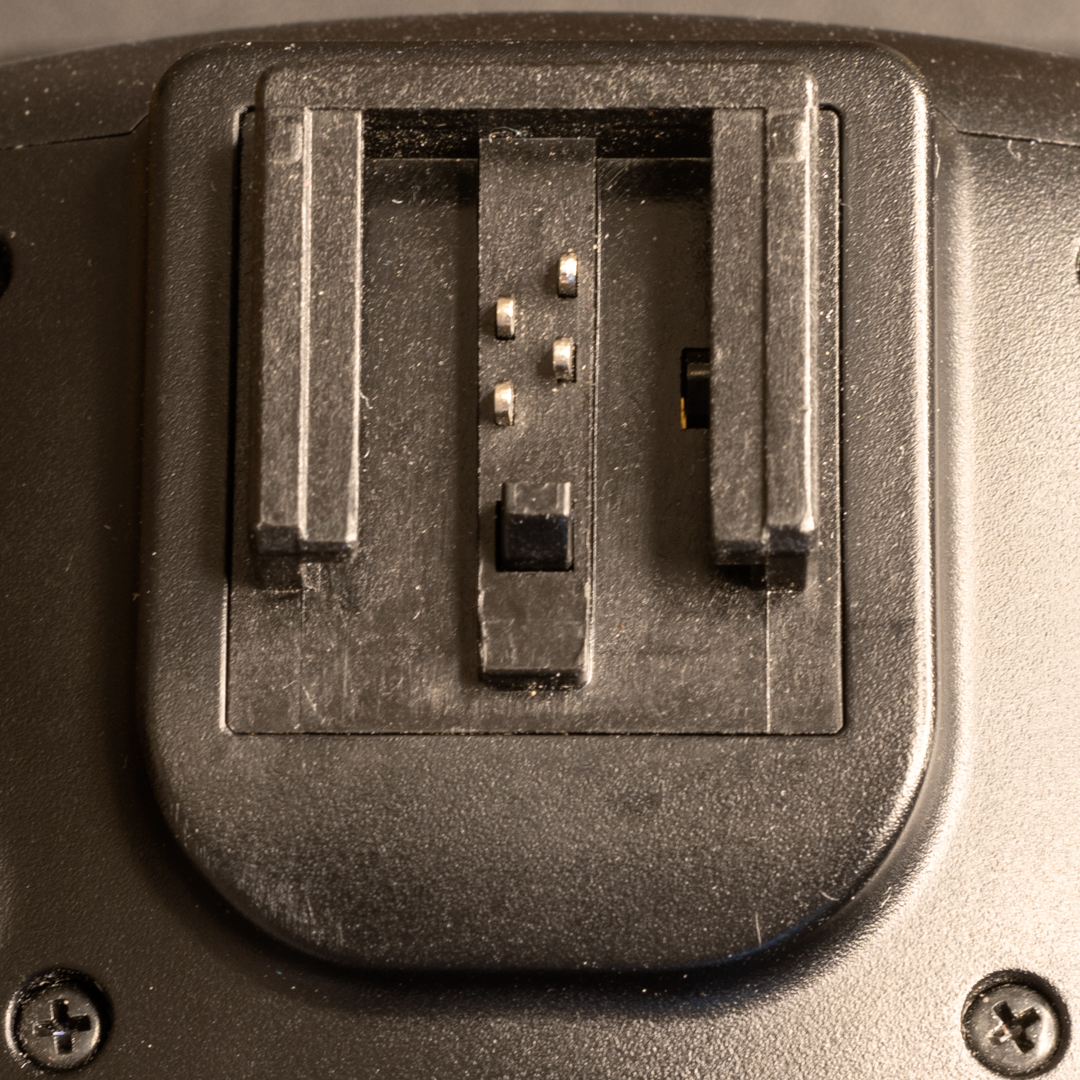
Hotshoe connection of Sony HVL-F42AM flash.

iISO (intelligent ISO) flash shoe (aka "reversed" hotshoe) is the unofficial name for the proprietary accessory flash attachment and control interface used on Minolta cameras since the i-series introduced in 1988, and subsequently Konica Minolta and later Sony α DSLRs and NEX-7 up to 2012. Sony called it the Auto-lock Accessory Shoe (AAS). In order to speed up and enhance attachment, detachment and latching, it departs from the conventional circa-1913 mechanical design that is now standardized as ISO 518:2006 and used by other camera systems, including Canon, Nikon, Pentax, Olympus, and Leica.

== History ==
The mechanical design of the accessory shoe now common on most cameras dates back to 1913, when Oskar Barnack, the inventor of the Leica, devised it for attaching an accessory viewfinder. By the 1940s, with the addition of the central contact, the design became commonly used for attaching and triggering accessory flashes and known as the "hot-shoe". Prior to 1988, Minolta has used that familiar, common hot-shoe design, adding, just like the other makers, its own proprietary contacts for enhanced control.

In 1988, Minolta introduced the iISO flash shoe in its new i series of cameras. Reportedly conceived with the input from Herbert Keppler in 1987, the new Minolta patented design featured a push-button latching mechanism, for the purpose of easier and faster flash attachment and removal and a more secure hold.

On 12 September 2012, Sony introduced a new 21+3-pin metal-based hotshoe with mechanical quick locking mechanism, called Multi Interface Shoe. At first sight it resembles a standard ISO 518 hotshoe with just the middle contact and chassis and without any vendor-specific extra contacts, but additional contacts are hidden under the front of the hotshoe. The new hotshoe is mechanically incompatible with the iISO hotshoe, but electrically backwards compatible. The first cameras to use the new hotshoe are the SLT-A99, NEX-6, NEX-VG900, NEX-VG30 and DSC-RX1. An ADP-MAA adapter to the iISO flash shoe is however provided with the Sony SLT-A99, and the newest flash Sony HVL-F60M, which uses the new hotshoe comes with a reverse adapter ADP-AMA for older Sony and Minolta cameras.

The last cameras introduced utilizing the iISO hotshoe in 2012 were the SLT-A37 and NEX-7 as well as the Hasselblad Lunar.

== Design ==
=== Mechanical ===
The use of the button-operated latch, besides facilitating a quick, one-handed flash attachment and detachment, also eliminates the possibility of the flash gradually working itself loose and shifting in the shoe, which on camera systems using the ISO 518 hot-shoe can lead to certain contacts being broken, contacts with the wrong pins being made, or in extreme cases the flash sliding off the hot-shoe entirely.

- Attachment
  As the flash slides onto the camera body, the sides of the T-shaped flange on the body engage the lips of the rotated C-shaped profile on the flash. When the flash is fully inserted, a spring-loaded latch on the flash locks into the indentation in the middle of the flash shoe.
- Detachment
  The user presses the unlock button on the flash body, which, by means of a lever or a wedge mechanism disengages the locking latch, enabling the user to slide off the flash from the camera body.

=== Electronic Contacts ===
Listed top-to-bottom (looking at the flash shoe socket as pictured above, or with the camera positioned with the lens pointing up): The electrical interface and protocol is backward-compatible with the older Minolta hotshoe, except for that it does not support the F4 signal, which was provided by the first generation of Minolta AF SLRs to control the AF illuminator, as this function became part of the digital protocol.

Pin	Wire	Analog	Digital
F3	black	TTL OK	Clock
F2	white	Ready	Bidirectional serial data
G	blue	Ground	Ground
F1	red	Sync / trigger flash	--

=== Variations ===
- Analog and digital control modes
  Digital control mode is used if a contemporary flash is detected by the camera. Otherwise, to support basic triggers and legacy and low-end flashes, analog interface is used.
- Additional electronic contacts on Minolta 3000i/3700i
  This low-end body omitted a built-in flash, and Minolta made available D-314i and D-316i compact and inexpensive flashes especially for it. These flashes relied on camera battery for power delivered via three additional pins on the hot shoe (+5V regulated and switched flash electronics power via an additional contact in the upper corner of the right contact column, and unregulated power and ground wired to the camera's battery to charge the flash via two high-power contacts located underneath the left and right rails). No other camera body has the additional contacts required to support the D-314i and D-316i flashes.

== Criticism ==
The iISO hot shoe's introduction left few informed users indifferent - some photographers loved it, while others hated it. The sentiment revolves around these areas:

- Legacy support
  During its 1988 introduction, the new Minolta iISO flash shoe presented an inconvenience to users with significant investment in the old, ISO 518 based Minolta flashes and accessories. The fact that Minolta chose to offset the new flash shoe introduction by three years from the 1985 SR-to-A-lens mount transition, as opposed to doing both concurrently, may have added insult to injury for some users. To soften the impact, Minolta had made available a FS-1100 (8825-670) adapter allowing to mount the old flashes and controllers on new bodies, and a FS-1200 (8825-680) to do the reverse. A custom-modified variant of the FS-1100 also featuring a PC terminal was made available by the Minolta service at request at least in Germany and the US, this part was also mentioned in the Minolta USA FAQs under the unofficial name "FS-PC" (8825-0000-00).
- Interoperability across systems
  It is possible to mount, say, a Canon flash directly on a Nikon body, and trigger it during the exposure. However, the ISO 518 hot-shoe standard does not govern electronic data transfer between the flash and the body (e.g. for charge and exposure status, TTL metering, ratio, focal length, ISO exposure index, distance, pre-flash metering, modeling light, red-eye reduction burst, wireless control). Different camera makers' dedicated flash systems are, in fact, incompatible in terms of both the proprietary contact layout and the communication protocol. That said, many current wireless radio triggers for professional studio strobe systems remain a relevant real-world application of the basic ISO 518 hot-shoe design. Their use with Sony and Minolta DSLRs requires either the Minolta FS-1100 adapter, now discontinued, or the Sony FA-HS1AM adapter. Named FA-SA1AM (2-8944-030-1), Sony also provided a mechanical-only mount adapter (similar to the FS-1100 but without any contacts) with the HVL-RLAM. There are also various third-party adapters such as the Seagull SC-5 or the Yongnuo YN-H3.
- There are also wireless radio triggers for the iISO flash shoe available, like the PixelPawn TF-363, the Phottix Strato II and many other systems.
