= Sony Alpha 580 =

Digital camera model

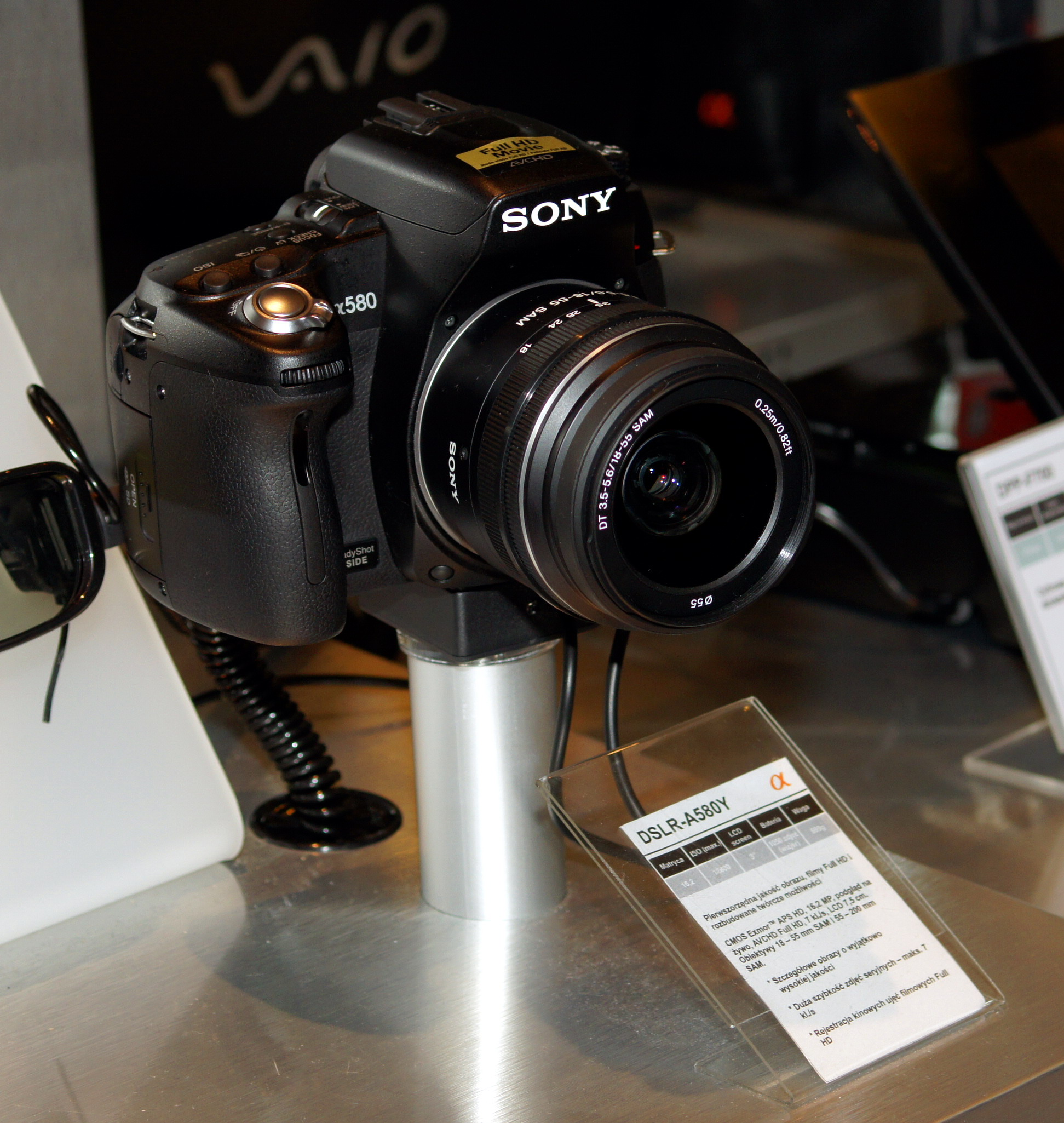
The camera on display

The Sony Alpha 580 (DSLR-A580) is a midrange-level digital single-lens reflex camera (DSLR) marketed by Sony and aimed at enthusiasts, it was released in August 2010. The camera features a 16.2 megapixel APS-C Type CMOS Exmor Sensor and features Sony's patented SteadyShot INSIDE stabilisation system which works with any attached lens.

== CMOS sensor ==
The camera's sensor is capable of recording in five different file formats:

- Raw (.ARW)
- Raw + JPEG Fine
- Raw + JPEG Standard
- JPEG Fine
- JPEG Standard

== Sony A580 anti-dust technology ==
To help combat dust particles on the sensor from changing lenses, Sony included both an anti-static coating on the sensor filter and anti-dust vibrations to automatically shake the sensor with the SteadyShot mechanism each time the camera is shut off. There is also a manual cleaning mode, where the camera first shakes the sensor, then lifts the mirror and opens the shutter, allowing access to the sensor for use with a blower or other cleaning device.

Level	Sensor	2004	2005	2006	2007	2008	2009	2010	2011		2012	2013	2014	2015	2016	2017	2018	2019	2020
Professional	Full frame						α900					α99				α99 II			
Professional	Full frame							α850											
High-end	APS-C		DG-7D			α700				α77				α77 II					
Midrange	APS-C									α65					α68				
Upper-entry	APS-C								α55		α57								
Upper-entry	APS-C				α100			α550 ^{F}	α580				α58						
Upper-entry	APS-C		DG-5D					α500	α560										
Upper-entry	APS-C							α450											
Entry-level	APS-C								α33	α35	α37								
Entry-level	APS-C					α350 ^{F}		α380	α390										
Entry-level	APS-C					α300		α330											
Entry-level	APS-C					α200		α230	α290										
Early models	Minolta 7000 with SB-70/SB-70S (1986) · Minolta 9000 with SB-90/SB-90S (1986) (Still video SLRs); Minolta MS-C1100 (1992) · Minolta RD-175 (1995)																		
Level	Sensor																		
Level	Sensor	2004	2005	2006	2007	2008	2009	2010	2011		2012	2013	2014	2015	2016	2017	2018	2019	2020
