= Sony α7 III =

2018 full-frame mirrorless camera

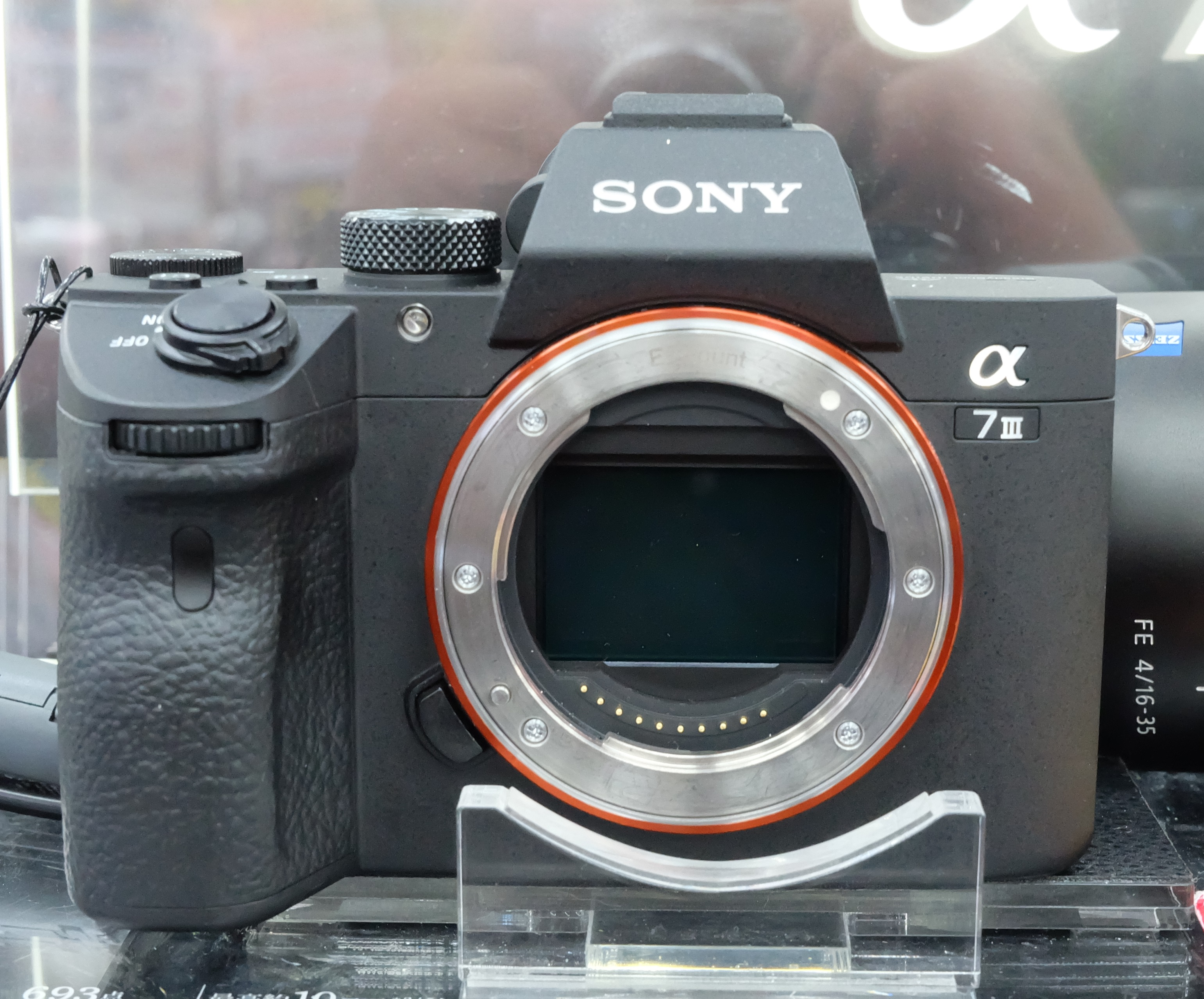

Overview
- Maker: Sony
- Type: Full-Frame Sony α (Alpha)
- Released: April 10, 2018
- Intro price: $1,999 USD body, $2,199 USD kit (28-70mm Zoom Lens)

Lens
- Lens mount: Sony E-mount
- Lens: Interchangeable
- Compatible lenses: Sony FE-mount lenses

Sensor/medium
- Sensor type: BSI-CMOS
- Sensor size: 35.6 × 23.8 mm (Full frame type)
- Maximum resolution: 6000 × 4000 (24 megapixels)
- Recording medium: SD, SDHC, or SDXC memory card

Focusing
- Focus areas: 693 focus points

Exposure/metering
- Exposure modes: P/A/S/M (stills/movie)

Flash
- Flash: No

Shutter
- Shutter: Mechanical, Electronic
- Shutter speeds: 1/8000 s to 30 s, BULB
- Continuous shooting: 10 frames per second

Viewfinder
- Viewfinder: Yes (electronic)

Image processing
- Image processor: BIONZ X
- White balance: Auto, Multiple preset options, Custom white balance

General
- Video recording: XAVC S 4K, XAVC S HD, AVCHD
- LCD screen: 76 mm (3 in) with 921,600 dots
- Battery: NP-FZ100
- AV port: Micro HDMI (Type D)
- Data port(s): USB 2.0 (Micro-B), USB 5Gbps (USB-C), Wi-Fi 4
- Dimensions: 127 by 96 by 74 mm (5.0 by 3.8 by 2.9 in)
- Weight: 650 g (23 oz) including battery
- Made in: China and Thailand

Chronology
- Predecessor: Sony α7 II
- Successor: Sony α7 IV

The Sony α7 III (model ILCE-7M3) is a full-frame mirrorless interchangeable-lens camera manufactured by Sony. It was announced on 26 February 2018 as the successor to the Sony α7 II and available from 10 April 2018. Described by Sony as "the basic model", the camera shares many features with the high-end Sony α7R III and α9 models. It was succeeded by the Sony α7 IV, announced on 21 October 2021.

== Features ==
The camera features several advancements over the previous model, the α7 II, incorporating some features from the higher-end α7R III and α9.

- 24 MP full-frame BSI CMOS sensor.
- 693 Phase Detection AF Points with 93% coverage, inherited from α9 and 425 contrast AF points.
- Continuous eye autofocus mode called Eye AF with High Tracking ability.
- 5-axis optical in-body image stabilization with a 5.0 step shutter speed advantage.
- 10 fps continuous shooting (mechanical or silent).
- Multiple 4K (3840x2160) video modes: 4K/24p oversampled from 6K sensor output, or 4K/30p oversampled from 5K cropped portion of sensor.
- 15 stops of dynamic range.
- Full HD (1920x1080) video at 120 fps.
- Larger 'Z'-series (NP-FZ100) battery from α9 and α7R III that is rated at 710 shots(CIPA measurement) - offering the world's longest battery life of any mirrorless camera.
- Upgraded operability and functionality including addition of joystick for adjusting focus points, Dual SD Card Slots, USB Type-C terminal with USB 5Gbps capabilities.
- ISO range from 100 to 51,200 (expandable to 204,800).
- Weather sealed, magnesium alloy body.
- No built-in flash.
- 2.36 million dot OLED electronic viewfinder with 0.78x magnification.
- Supports 4 different video file formats (XAVC S 4K, XAVC S HD, or AVCHD).

== Improvements over the Sony α7 II ==
The Sony α7 III improved in a number of aspects compared to its predecessor, the α7 II, which was released four years earlier in November, 2014.

- 4K video modes and 120fps full HD video instead of the A7 II's limited full HD (1920x1080) movie modes.
- Continuous burst increased to 10fps instead of 5fps.
- Maximum ISO sensitivity of 51,200 instead of 25,600.
- Upgraded sensor with 693 Phase Detection auto-focus points vs. 117 Phase Detection AF points.
- Newer Z battery system (NP-FZ100) rated to 710 shots instead of 340.
- Battery capacity 7.2V / 16.4Wh (2280mAh).
- Dual SD card slots instead of a single card slot.
- Bluetooth for increased phone communication options.
- Introduction of a touch screen but lower resolution 922,000 dot display instead of 1.23 million.
- Newer ergonomic layout similar to the earlier A9 and A7R III including the addition of a joystick.

The camera's rounded feature set and launch price were highly praised. Reviewers noted it as a flexible and competitive tool for all types of photography.

== Issues ==
The Sony A7 III does not have a vertical anti-aliasing filter, it only has a horizontal one. It improves sharpness, but also creates a visible amount of moiré on clothes and hair.

== See also ==
- Comparison of Sony α7 cameras
- List of Sony E-mount lenses
- Exmor R

Family	Level	Format	'10	2011		2012	2013	2014	2015	2016	2017	2018	2019	2020	2021	2022	2023	2024	2025	2026
Alpha (α)	Indust	FF																ILX-LR1 ^{●}		
Alpha (α)	Cine line	FF													_{m} FX6 ^{●}					
Alpha (α)	Cine line	FF																		_{m} FX5 ^{AT●}
Alpha (α)	Cine line	FF													_{m} FX3 ^{AT●}					
Alpha (α)	Cine line	FF																		_{m} FX2 ^{AT●}
Alpha (α)	Flag	FF													_{m} α1 ^{FT●}				_{m} α1 II ^{FAT●}	
Alpha (α)	Speed	FF										_{m} α9 ^{FT●}			_{m} α9 II ^{FT●}				_{m} α9 III ^{FAT●}	
Alpha (α)	Sens	FF							_{m} α7S ^{●}	_{m} α7S II ^{F●}					_{m} α7S III ^{AT●}					
Alpha (α)	Hi-Res	FF						_{m} α7R ^{●}		_{m} α7R II ^{F●}		_{m} α7R III ^{FT●}		_{m} α7R IV ^{FT●}			_{m} α7R V ^{FAT●}			_{m} α7R VI ^{FAT●}
Alpha (α)	Basic	FF						_{m} α7 ^{F●}	_{m} α7 II ^{F●}				_{m} α7 III ^{FT●}			_{m} α7 IV ^{AT●}				_{m} α7 V ^{FAT●}
Alpha (α)	Compact	FF																_{m} α7CR ^{AT●}		
Alpha (α)	Compact	FF													_{m} α7C ^{AT●}			_{m} α7C II ^{AT●}		
Alpha (α)	Vlog	FF																_{m} ZV-E1 ^{AT●}		
Alpha (α)	Cine	APS-C															_{m} FX30 ^{AT●}			
Alpha (α)	Adv	APS-C			_{s} NEX-7 ^{F●}						_{m} α6500 ^{FT●}			_{m} α6600 ^{FT●}				_{m} α6700 ^{AT●}		
Alpha (α)	Mid-range	APS-C				_{m} NEX-6 ^{F●}					_{m} α6300 ^{F●}		_{m} α6400 ^{F+T●}							
Alpha (α)	Mid-range	APS-C						_{m} α6000 ^{F●}						_{m} α6100 ^{FT●}						
Alpha (α)	Vlog	APS-C														_{m} ZV-E10 ^{AT●}			_{m} ZV-E10 II ^{AT●}	
Alpha (α)	Entry-level	APS-C	NEX-5 ^{F●}	NEX-5N ^{FT●}		NEX-5R ^{F+T●}	NEX-5T ^{F+T●}		α5100 ^{F+T●}											
Alpha (α)	Entry-level	APS-C	NEX-3 ^{F●}	NEX-C3 ^{F●}		NEX-F3 ^{F+●}	NEX-3N ^{F+●}	α5000 ^{F+●}												
DSLR-style		APS-C					_{m} α3000 ^{●}		_{m} α3500 ^{●}											
SmartShot		APS-C							QX1 ^{M●}											
CineAlta	Cine line	FF										VENICE				VENICE 2				
CineAlta	Cine line	FF																BURANO		
XDCAM	Cine line	FF												_{m} FX9						
XDCAM	Docu	S35							_{m} FS7		_{m} FS7 II									
XDCAM	Mobile	S35								_{m} FS5			_{m} FS5 II							
NXCAM	Pro	S35		NEX-FS100		NEX-FS700	NEX-FS700R													
NXCAM	APS-C					NEX-EA50														
Handycam	FF					_{m} NEX-VG900														
Handycam	APS-C		_{s} NEX-VG10		_{s} NEX-VG20	_{m} NEX-VG30														
Security		FF									SNC-VB770									
Security		FF									UMC-S3C									
Family	Level	Format																		
Family	Level	Format	'10	2011		2012	2013	2014	2015	2016	2017	2018	2019	2020	2021	2022	2023	2024	2025	2026
