= Sony α7 IV =

2021 full-frame mirrorless camera

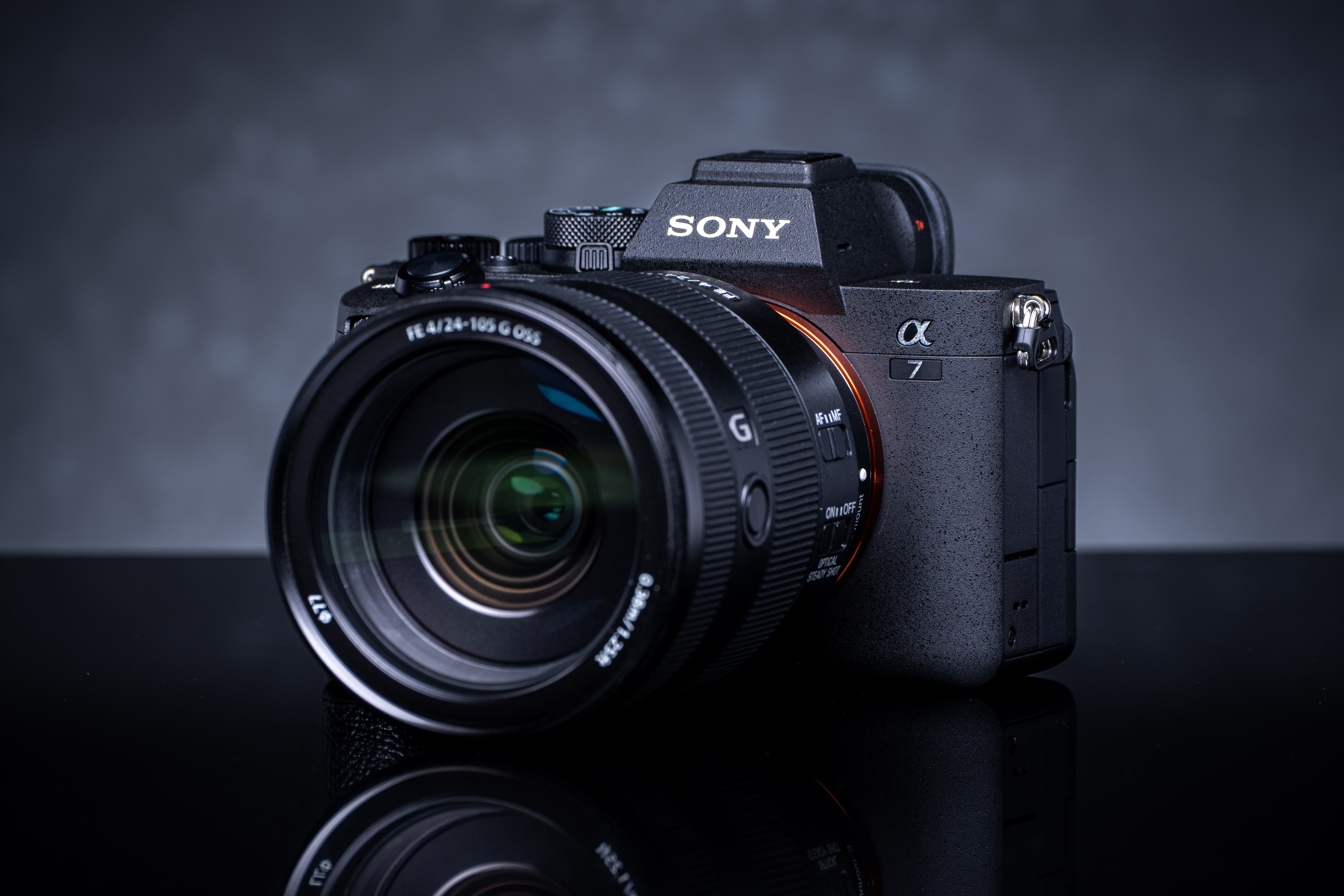

Overview
- Maker: Sony
- Released: 21 October 2021
- Intro price: $2,499 USD body, $2,699 USD kit (28-70mm Zoom Lens)

Lens
- Lens mount: Sony E-mount
- Lens: Interchangeable
- Compatible lenses: Full-Frame and APS-C E-mount lenses

Sensor/medium
- Sensor type: BSI-CMOS
- Sensor size: 35.9 × 23.9 mm (Full frame type)
- Sensor maker: Sony Semiconductor Solutions Corporation
- Maximum resolution: 7008 × 4672 (33 megapixels)
- Recording medium: SD, SDHC, SDXC, CF Express Type A memory card

Flash
- Flash: No
- Flash synchronization: 1/250 second (Full-frame), 1/320 second (APS-C size)
- Flash bracketing: Sony Mi-Shoe Mount

Shutter
- Shutter: Mechanical, Electronic
- Shutter speeds: 1/8000 s to 30 s, BULB
- Continuous shooting: 10 frames per second

Viewfinder
- Viewfinder: Yes, 1.3 cm (0.5 type) Electronic Viewfinder
- Viewfinder magnification: Approx. 0.78× with 50 mm lens at infinity
- Frame coverage: 100%

Image processing
- Image processor: BIONZ XR

General
- LCD screen: 76 mm (3 in) with 1.03M dots
- Battery: NP-FZ100 Lithium-Ion rechargeable battery
- AV port: HDMI (Type A)
- Data port(s): USB 2.0 (Micro-B), USB 10Gbps (USB-C), Wi-Fi 5, Bluetooth 4.2
- Dimensions: 131.3 by 96.4 by 79.8 mm (5.17 by 3.80 by 3.14 in)
- Weight: 658 g (23 oz)
- Made in: Thailand and China

Chronology
- Predecessor: Sony α7 III
- Successor: Sony α7 V

References
- "ILCE-7M4 | Help Guide | Specifications". helpguide.sony.net. Sony Electronics Inc.

The Sony α7 IV (model ILCE-7M4) is a full-frame mirrorless interchangeable-lens camera manufactured by Sony. It was announced on 21 October 2021 as the successor to the Sony α7 III. Featuring a new 34.1MP (approx. total) back-illuminated CMOS sensor inside, latest BIONZ XR™ image processor, Real-Time Eye AF tracking and 4K 60p video with Super 35mm mode. It was succeeded by the Sony α7 V, announced on 2 December, 2025.

== Features ==
The camera features several advancements from its predecessor the Sony α7 III, also incorporating some pro features from the high-end Sony α1.

- 33 MP (approx. effective) full-frame BSI-CMOS sensor
- 759 phase detection autofocus points and 425 contrast detection autofocus points
- Continuous Eye-AF tracking for Human, Animal & Bird
- Improved UI layout (new menu structure) compared to its predecessor
- Closed mechanical shutter function when the camera is turned off (feature debuted in α1)
- Flip 3-inch LCD vari-angle touchscreen with 1.04 million dots
- 3.69-million-dot OLED Quad-VGA resolution 120 fps refresh rate EVF, 1.6× resolution compared to α7 III
- 5-axis optical in-body image stabilisation with a 5.5 stops of shake reduction
- 10 fps continuous burst shooting (mechanical or electronic silent shutter) with compressed Raw, 6 fps with Uncompressed Raw
- Live stream through the USB Type-C connector in 4K^{(15 fps)} or FHD^{(60 fps)}
- Up to 4K 30p video recording with 7K oversampling available in full-frame mode, 4K 60p recording in Super 35mm mode
- 15-stop dynamic range
- Slow & Quick motion features up to 120 fps
- Battery life with NP-FZ100 is rated at approximately 580 images using LCD screen and approximately 520 images using EVF according to CIPA rating method
- Native ISO range is 100-51,200, extended ISO range is 50-204,800
- 10-bit HEIF image option (using .heic container)
- Weather sealed, magnesium alloy body
- No built-in flash
- Multi Interface (Mi Shoe) shoe with Sony's unique metal shoe
- Supports 4 different video file formats (XAVC HS 4K, XAVC S-I 4K, XAVC S 4K, XAVC S HD)
- Dual SD card slots, single CFExpress Type A slot (SLOT 1)

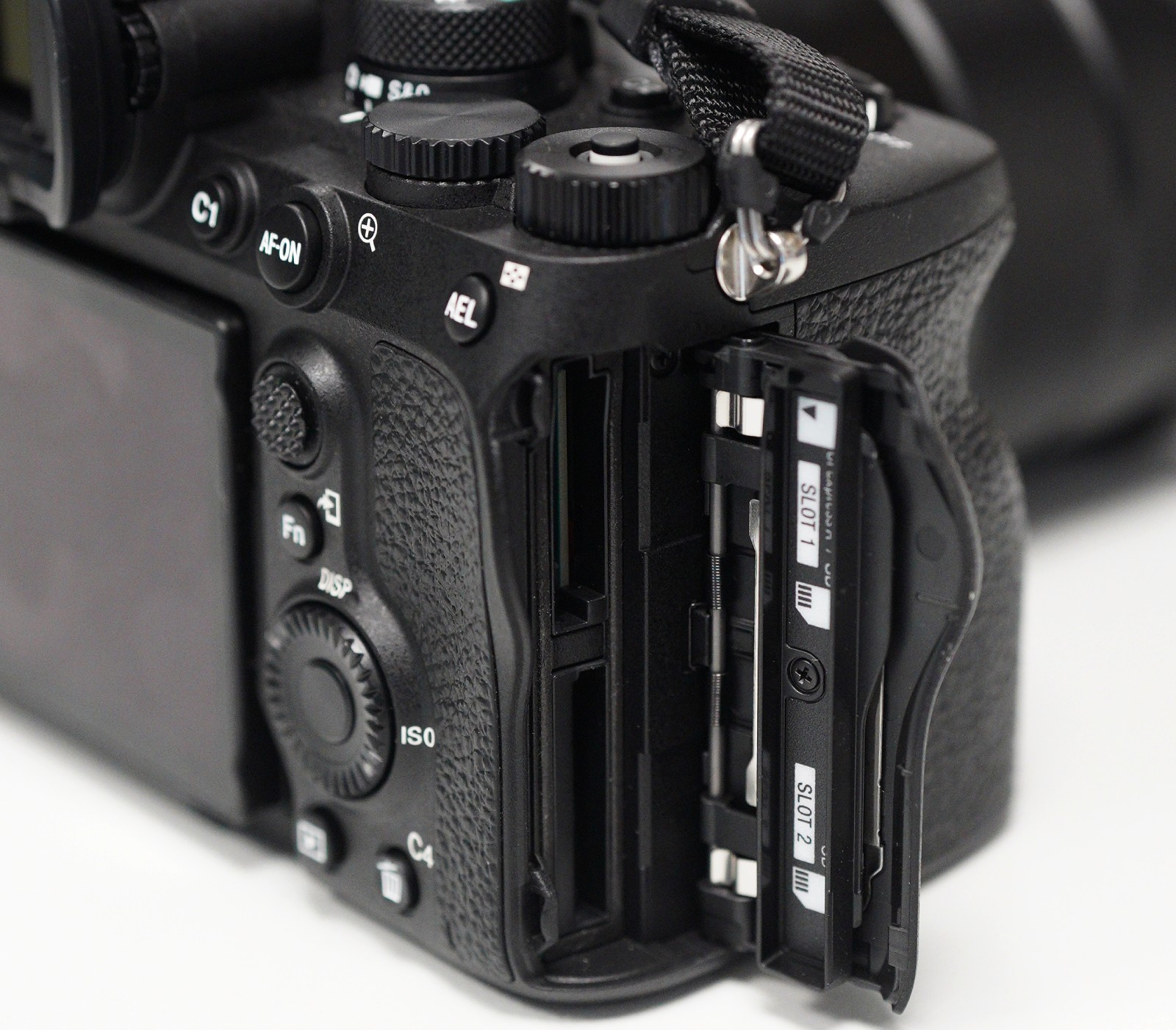
Dual memory card slots of the right side of the Sony α7 IV, the camera supports the operation while both card slots are occupied, both card slots supports UHS-I and UHS-II class SD cards

1 / CFexpress Type A & SD card slot	2 / SD only slot

== Dynamic range and color independent testing ==
Independent testing by Gerald Undone using Imatest software and a Xyla color range chart demonstrates 12.8 stops of dynamic range, which is approximately 1/3 of a stop better than the Sony α7S III and approximately the same as the Sony α1 It color matches fairly well with the α7S III and α1, with the α7S III leaning a bit green, the α1 a bit magenta, and this camera between the two (tested using DCS Labs -SW - CDM 28R - v15.2 A3 color chart) and with individual white balancing, the colors are very similar.

== Video formats ==
Camera is using in-house developed AVC Video Format called XAVC. The format is compressed format, achieving balanced quality and file size. Recording in color depth of 10 bits and 4:2:2 chroma subsampling is possible with Sony's XAVC codec.

- All Intra-frame system that compresses each frame individually to achieve best quality.
- When recording 4K movies in the XAVC HS format is an optional which is using a HEVC codec (H.265) and has high compression efficiency.
  - The camera can record movies with higher image quality than XAVC S movies but the same data volume.
- Camera can record in "Long GOP" codec (H.264) compression, which is compressing multiple frames to reduce file size.

== Video resolutions and modes ==
PAL modes and NTSC modes have different recording frame rates and record settings.

Selectable video modes in PAL mode
File formats	Recoding frame rate	Record setting	APS-C/Super 35 mode availability
XAVC HS 4K	50p	200M 4:2:2 10-bit 150M 4:2:0 10-bit 100M 4:2:2 10-bit 75M 4:2:0 10-bit 45M 4:2:0 10-bit	Forced
XAVC S 4K	50p	200M 4:2:2 10-bit 150M 4:2:0 8-bit	Forced
XAVC S 4K	25p	140M 4:2:2 10-bit 100M 4:2:0 8-bit 60M 4:2:0 8-bit	Available
XAVC S HD	50p	50M 4:2:2 10-bit 50M 4:2:0 8-bit 25M 4:2:0 8-bit	Available
XAVC S HD	25p	50M 4:2:2 10-bit 50M 4:2:0 8-bit 16M 4:2:0 8-bit	Available
XAVC S HD	100p	100M 4:2:0 8-bit 60M 4:2:0 8-bit	Available
XAVC S-I 4K	50p	500M 4:2:2 10-bit	Forced
XAVC S-I 4K	25p	250M 4:2:2 10-bit	Available
XAVC S-I HD	50p	185M 4:2:2 10-bit	Available
XAVC S-I HD	25p	93M 4:2:2 10-bit	Available

Selectable video modes in NTSC mode
File formats	Recoding frame rate	Record setting	APS-C/Super 35 mode availability
XAVC HS 4K	60p	200M 4:2:2 10-bit 150M 4:2:0 10-bit 100M 4:2:2 10-bit 75M 4:2:0 10-bit 45M 4:2:0 10-bit	Forced
XAVC HS 4K	24p	100M 4:2:2 10-bit 100M 4:2:0 10-bit 50M 4:2:2 10-bit 50M 4:2:0 10-bit 30M 4:2:0 10-bit	Available
XAVC S 4K	60p	200M 4:2:2 10-bit 150M 4:2:0 8-bit	Forced
XAVC S 4K	30p	140M 4:2:2 10-bit 100M 4:2:0 8-bit 60M 4:2:0 8-bit	Available
XAVC S 4K	24p	100M 4:2:2 10-bit 100M 4:2:0 8-bit 60M 4:2:0 8-bit	Available
XAVC S HD	60p	50M 4:2:2 10-bit 50M 4:2:0 8-bit 25M 4:2:0 8-bit	Available
XAVC S HD	30p	50M 4:2:2 10-bit 50M 4:2:0 8-bit 16M 4:2:0 8-bit	Available
XAVC S HD	24p	50M 4:2:2 10-bit 50M 4:2:0 8-bit	Available
XAVC S HD	100p	100M 4:2:0 8-bit 60M 4:2:0 8-bit	Available
XAVC S-I 4K	60p	600M 4:2:2 10-bit	Forced
XAVC S-I 4K	30p	300M 4:2:2 10-bit	Available
XAVC S-I 4K	24p	240M 4:2:2 10-bit	Available
XAVC S-I HD	60p	222M 4:2:2 10-bit	Available
XAVC S-I HD	30p	111M 4:2:2 10-bit	Available
XAVC S-I HD	24p	89M 4:2:2 10-bit	Available

Available Slow and Quick motion shooting modes in PAL and NTSC Mode:

S&Q in PAL Mode
File formats	Recoding frame rate	Final clip frame rate	Record setting	APS-C/Super 35 mode availability
Slow and Quick Motion (XAVC S)	50p	50 fps 25 fps (2x Quick motion) 12 fps (4.16x Quick motion) 6 fps (8.33x Quick motion) 3 fps (16.66x Quick motion) 2 fps (25x Quick motion) 1 fps (50x Quick motion)	200M 4:2:2 10-bit 150M 4:2:0 8-bit	Forced
Slow and Quick Motion (XAVC S)	25p	50 fps (2x Slow motion) 25 fps 12 fps (2.08x Quick motion) 6 fps (4.16x Quick motion) 3 fps (8.33x Quick motion) 2 fps (12.5x Quick motion) 1 fps (25x Quick motion)	140M 4:2:2 10-bit 100M 4:2:0 8-bit 60M 4:2:0 8-bit	Available
Slow and Quick Motion (XAVC S)	100p	100 fps 50 fps (2x Quick motion) 25 fps (4x Quick motion) 12 fps (8.33x Quick motion) 6 fps (16.66x Quick motion) 3 fps (33.33x Quick motion) 2 fps (50x Quick motion) 1 fps (100x Quick motion)	100M 4:2:0 8-bit 60M 4:2:0 8-bit	Available

S&Q in NTSC Mode
File formats	Recoding frame rate	Final clip frame rate	Record setting	APS-C/Super 35 mode availability
Slow and Quck Motion (XAVC S)	60p	60 fps 30 fps (2x Quick motion) 15 fps (4x Quick motion) 8 fps (7.5x Quick motion) 4 fps (15x Quick motion) 2 fps (30x Quick motion) 1 fps (60x Quick motion)	200M 4:2:2 10-bit 150M 4:2:0 8-bit	Forced
Slow and Quck Motion (XAVC S)	30p	60 fps (2x Slow motion) 30 fps 15 fps (2x Quick motion) 8 fps (3.75x Quick motion) 4 fps (7.5x Quick motion) 2 fps (15x Quick motion) 1 fps (30x Quick motion)	140M 4:2:2 10-bit 100M 4:2:0 8-bit 60M 4:2:0 8-bit	Available
Slow and Quck Motion (XAVC S)	24p	60 fps (2.5x Slow motion) 30 fps (1.25x Slow motion) 15 fps (1.6x Quick motion) 8 fps (3x Quick motion) 4 fps (6x Quick motion) 2 fps (12x Quick motion) 1 fps (24x Quick motion)	140M 4:2:2 10-bit 100M 4:2:0 8-bit 60M 4:2:0 8-bit	Available
Slow and Quck Motion (XAVC S)	120p (XAVC S HD Only)	120 fps 60 fps (2x Slow motion) 30 fps (4x Quick motion) 15 fps (8x Quick motion) 8 fps (15x Quick motion) 4 fps (30x Quick motion) 2 fps (60x Quick motion) 1 fps (120x Quick motion)	100M 4:2:0 8-bit 60M 4:2:0 8-bit	Available

== See also ==
- Comparison of Sony α7 cameras
- List of Sony E-mount lenses
- Exmor R

Family	Level	Format	'10	2011		2012	2013	2014	2015	2016	2017	2018	2019	2020	2021	2022	2023	2024	2025	2026
Alpha (α)	Indust	FF																ILX-LR1 ^{●}		
Alpha (α)	Cine line	FF													_{m} FX6 ^{●}					
Alpha (α)	Cine line	FF													_{m} FX3 ^{AT●}					
Alpha (α)	Cine line	FF																		_{m} FX2 ^{AT●}
Alpha (α)	Flag	FF													_{m} α1 ^{FT●}				_{m} α1 II ^{FAT●}	
Alpha (α)	Speed	FF										_{m} α9 ^{FT●}			_{m} α9 II ^{FT●}				_{m} α9 III ^{FAT●}	
Alpha (α)	Sens	FF							_{m} α7S ^{●}	_{m} α7S II ^{F●}					_{m} α7S III ^{AT●}					
Alpha (α)	Hi-Res	FF						_{m} α7R ^{●}		_{m} α7R II ^{F●}		_{m} α7R III ^{FT●}		_{m} α7R IV ^{FT●}			_{m} α7R V ^{FAT●}			_{m} α7R VI ^{FAT●}
Alpha (α)	Basic	FF						_{m} α7 ^{F●}	_{m} α7 II ^{F●}				_{m} α7 III ^{FT●}			_{m} α7 IV ^{AT●}				_{m} α7 V ^{FAT●}
Alpha (α)	Compact	FF																_{m} α7CR ^{AT●}		
Alpha (α)	Compact	FF													_{m} α7C ^{AT●}			_{m} α7C II ^{AT●}		
Alpha (α)	Vlog	FF																_{m} ZV-E1 ^{AT●}		
Alpha (α)	Cine	APS-C															_{m} FX30 ^{AT●}			
Alpha (α)	Adv	APS-C			_{s} NEX-7 ^{F●}						_{m} α6500 ^{FT●}			_{m} α6600 ^{FT●}				_{m} α6700 ^{AT●}		
Alpha (α)	Mid-range	APS-C				_{m} NEX-6 ^{F●}					_{m} α6300 ^{F●}		_{m} α6400 ^{F+T●}							
Alpha (α)	Mid-range	APS-C						_{m} α6000 ^{F●}						_{m} α6100 ^{FT●}						
Alpha (α)	Vlog	APS-C														_{m} ZV-E10 ^{AT●}			_{m} ZV-E10 II ^{AT●}	
Alpha (α)	Entry-level	APS-C	NEX-5 ^{F●}	NEX-5N ^{FT●}		NEX-5R ^{F+T●}	NEX-5T ^{F+T●}		α5100 ^{F+T●}											
Alpha (α)	Entry-level	APS-C	NEX-3 ^{F●}	NEX-C3 ^{F●}		NEX-F3 ^{F+●}	NEX-3N ^{F+●}	α5000 ^{F+●}												
DSLR-style		APS-C					_{m} α3000 ^{●}		_{m} α3500 ^{●}											
SmartShot		APS-C							QX1 ^{M●}											
CineAlta	Cine line	FF										VENICE				VENICE 2				
CineAlta	Cine line	FF																BURANO		
XDCAM	Cine line	FF												_{m} FX9						
XDCAM	Docu	S35							_{m} FS7		_{m} FS7 II									
XDCAM	Mobile	S35								_{m} FS5			_{m} FS5 II							
NXCAM	Pro	S35		NEX-FS100		NEX-FS700	NEX-FS700R													
NXCAM	APS-C					NEX-EA50														
Handycam	FF					_{m} NEX-VG900														
Handycam	APS-C		_{s} NEX-VG10		_{s} NEX-VG20	_{m} NEX-VG30														
Security		FF									SNC-VB770									
Security		FF									UMC-S3C									
Family	Level	Format																		
Family	Level	Format	'10	2011		2012	2013	2014	2015	2016	2017	2018	2019	2020	2021	2022	2023	2024	2025	2026
