= Sony α7R II =

2015 full-frame mirrorless camera

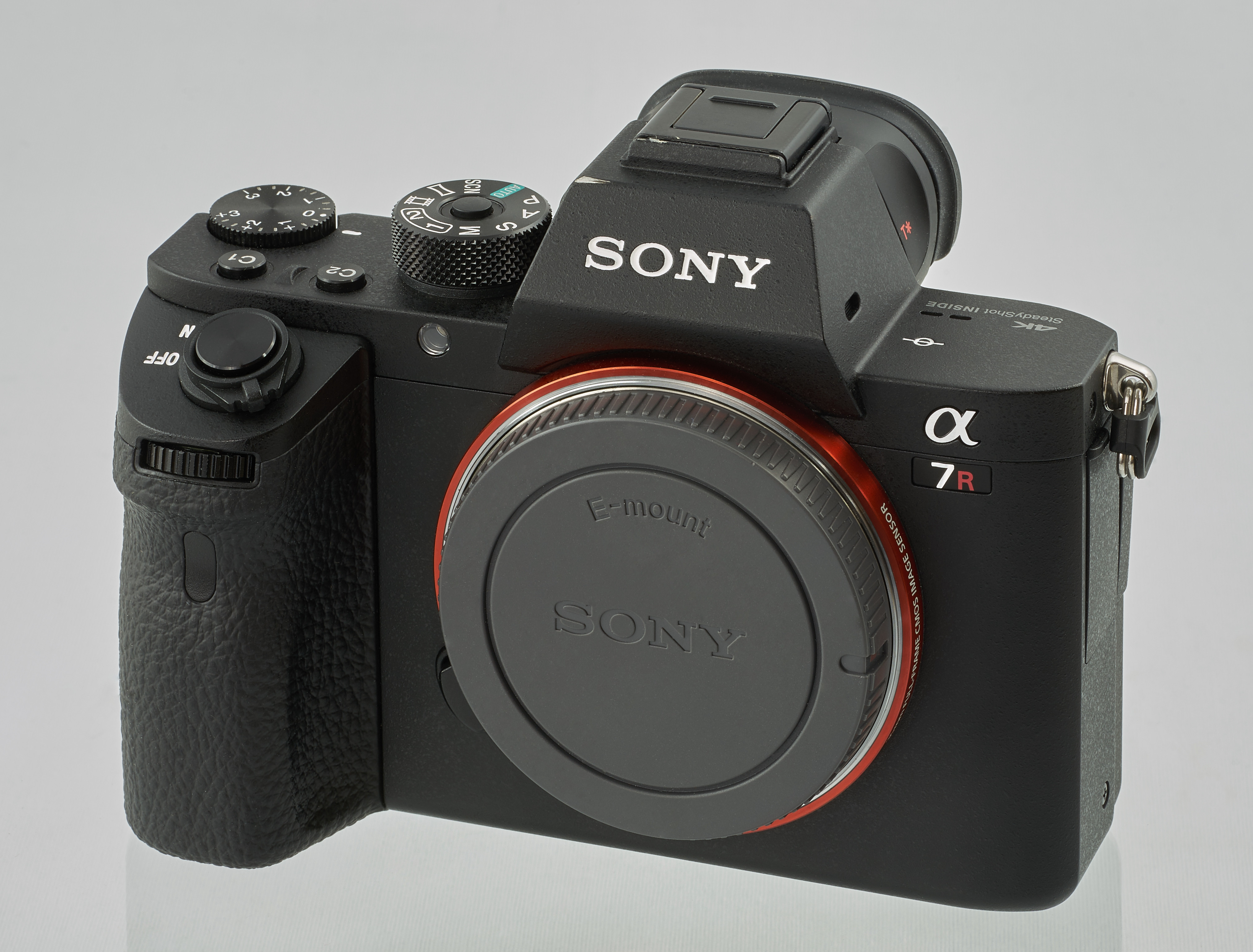

Overview
- Maker: Sony
- Released: June 2015
- Intro price: 3,199

Lens
- Lens mount: Sony E-mount

Sensor/medium
- Sensor type: BSI-CMOS
- Sensor size: 35.9 × 24 mm (Full frame type)
- Maximum resolution: 7974 × 5316 (42.4 megapixels)
- Film speed: ISO 100 - 25600 expands to ISO 50 - 102400 (still images)
- Recording medium: SD, SDHC, or SDXC memory card or Memory Stick Duo/Pro Duo/Pro-HG Duo

Focusing
- Focus areas: 399 focus points

Flash
- Flash: no

Shutter
- Frame rate: 60fps
- Shutter speeds: 1/8000 s to 30 s
- Continuous shooting: 5 frames per second

Viewfinder
- Viewfinder magnification: 0.78
- Frame coverage: 100%

Image processing
- Image processor: BIONZ X
- White balance: Yes

General
- Video recording: 4K at 30 fps or 24 fps in the compressed XAVC S
- LCD screen: 76 mm (3 in) with 1,228,800 dots
- Dimensions: 126.9 by 95.7 by 60.3 mm (5.00 by 3.77 by 2.37 in)
- Weight: 625 g (22 oz) including battery
- Made in: Thailand

Chronology
- Replaced: Sony α7R
- Successor: Sony α7R III

The Sony α7R II (model ILCE-7RM2) is a full-frame mirrorless interchangeable-lens camera in the Sony α7 series of cameras. It was announced by Sony on 10 June 2015. At the time of its release, it had the largest backside illuminated CMOS sensor of any camera in the market, the previous largest being used in the Samsung NX1 released only months earlier. The camera was released 5 August 2015. Some of its most notable features are the 42 megapixels and the 399 on-sensor phase detection points.

== See also ==
- Comparison of Sony α7 cameras
- Sony α7R III
- Sony α7II
- Sony α9
- Exmor R

Family	Level	Format	'10	2011		2012	2013	2014	2015	2016	2017	2018	2019	2020	2021	2022	2023	2024	2025	2026
Alpha (α)	Indust	FF																ILX-LR1 ^{●}		
Alpha (α)	Cine line	FF													_{m} FX6 ^{●}					
Alpha (α)	Cine line	FF													_{m} FX3 ^{AT●}					
Alpha (α)	Cine line	FF																		_{m} FX2 ^{AT●}
Alpha (α)	Flag	FF													_{m} α1 ^{FT●}				_{m} α1 II ^{FAT●}	
Alpha (α)	Speed	FF										_{m} α9 ^{FT●}			_{m} α9 II ^{FT●}				_{m} α9 III ^{FAT●}	
Alpha (α)	Sens	FF							_{m} α7S ^{●}	_{m} α7S II ^{F●}					_{m} α7S III ^{AT●}					
Alpha (α)	Hi-Res	FF						_{m} α7R ^{●}		_{m} α7R II ^{F●}		_{m} α7R III ^{FT●}		_{m} α7R IV ^{FT●}			_{m} α7R V ^{FAT●}			
Alpha (α)	Basic	FF						_{m} α7 ^{F●}	_{m} α7 II ^{F●}				_{m} α7 III ^{FT●}			_{m} α7 IV ^{AT●}				
Alpha (α)	Compact	FF																_{m} α7CR ^{AT●}		
Alpha (α)	Compact	FF													_{m} α7C ^{AT●}			_{m} α7C II ^{AT●}		
Alpha (α)	Vlog	FF																_{m} ZV-E1 ^{AT●}		
Alpha (α)	Cine	APS-C															_{m} FX30 ^{AT●}			
Alpha (α)	Adv	APS-C			_{s} NEX-7 ^{F●}						_{m} α6500 ^{FT●}			_{m} α6600 ^{FT●}				_{m} α6700 ^{AT●}		
Alpha (α)	Mid-range	APS-C				_{m} NEX-6 ^{F●}					_{m} α6300 ^{F●}		_{m} α6400 ^{F+T●}							
Alpha (α)	Mid-range	APS-C						_{m} α6000 ^{F●}						_{m} α6100 ^{FT●}						
Alpha (α)	Vlog	APS-C														_{m} ZV-E10 ^{AT●}			_{m} ZV-E10 II ^{AT●}	
Alpha (α)	Entry-level	APS-C	NEX-5 ^{F●}	NEX-5N ^{FT●}		NEX-5R ^{F+T●}	NEX-5T ^{F+T●}		α5100 ^{F+T●}											
Alpha (α)	Entry-level	APS-C	NEX-3 ^{F●}	NEX-C3 ^{F●}		NEX-F3 ^{F+●}	NEX-3N ^{F+●}	α5000 ^{F+●}												
DSLR-style		APS-C					_{m} α3000 ^{●}		_{m} α3500 ^{●}											
SmartShot		APS-C							QX1 ^{M●}											
CineAlta	Cine line	FF										VENICE				VENICE 2				
CineAlta	Cine line	FF																BURANO		
XDCAM	Cine line	FF												_{m} FX9						
XDCAM	Docu	S35							_{m} FS7		_{m} FS7 II									
XDCAM	Mobile	S35								_{m} FS5			_{m} FS5 II							
NXCAM	Pro	S35		NEX-FS100		NEX-FS700	NEX-FS700R													
NXCAM	APS-C					NEX-EA50														
Handycam	FF					_{m} NEX-VG900														
Handycam	APS-C		_{s} NEX-VG10		_{s} NEX-VG20	_{m} NEX-VG30														
Security		FF									SNC-VB770									
Security		FF									UMC-S3C									
Family	Level	Format																		
Family	Level	Format	'10	2011		2012	2013	2014	2015	2016	2017	2018	2019	2020	2021	2022	2023	2024	2025	2026
