= Sony α7 =

2013 full-frame mirrorless camera

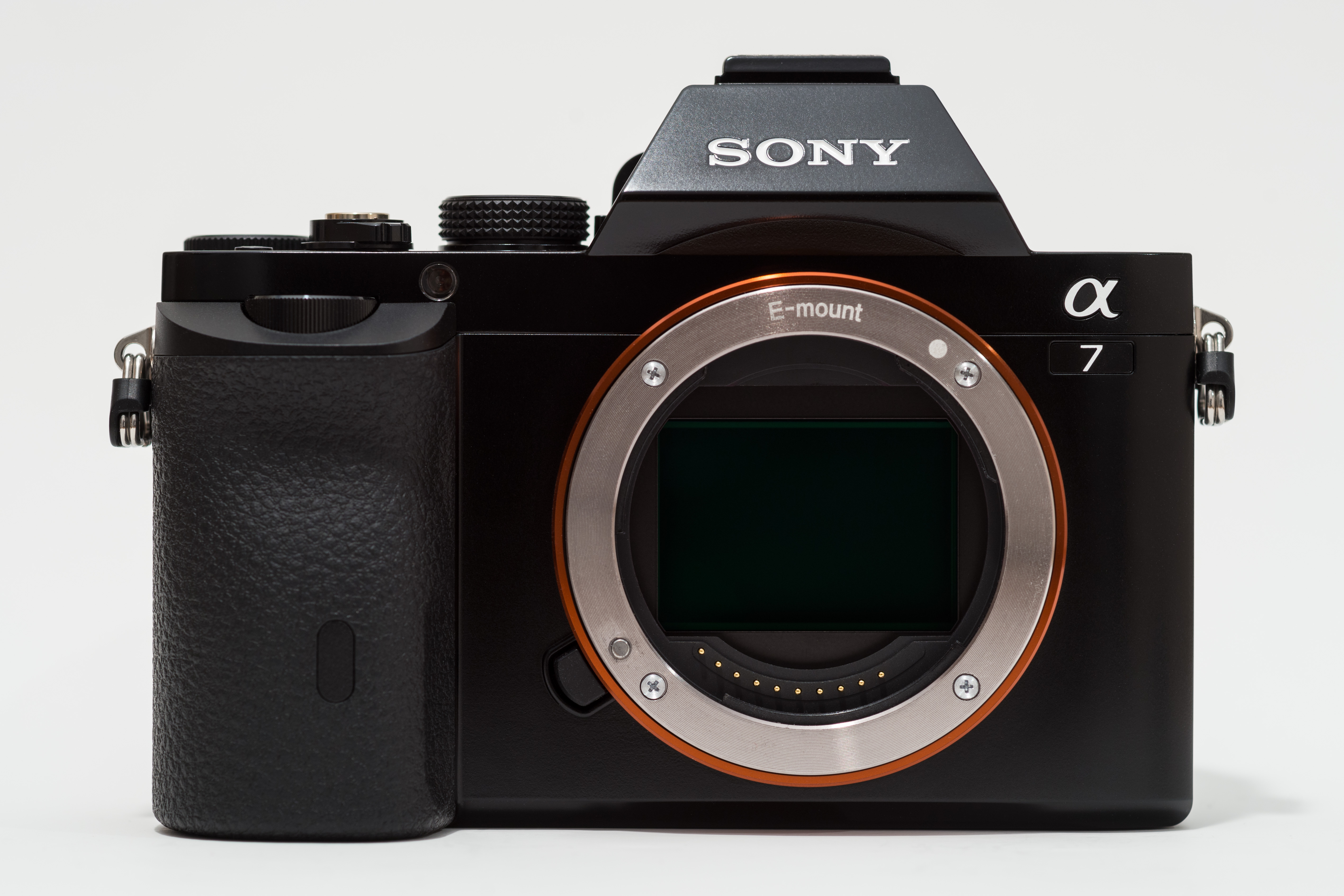

Overview
- Maker: Sony Group
- Type: Full-frame mirrorless interchangeable-lens camera
- Released: October 2013

Lens
- Lens: Sony E-mount

Sensor/medium
- Sensor: 35.8×23.9 mm Exmor full-frame HD CMOS Sensor
- Maximum resolution: 6000×4000 (3:2) (24 megapixels)
- Film speed: Auto, 100–25600
- Storage media: Memory Stick Pro Duo, Pro-HG Duo, SD, SDHC, SDXC (α7R IV supports only SD family)

Focusing
- Focus modes: Contrast Detect (sensor), Phase Detect, Multi-area, Center, Selective single-point, Single, Continuous, Face Detection, Live View

Exposure/metering
- Exposure metering: Multi-segment, Center-weighted, Spot

Shutter
- Shutter: Electronically-controlled, vertical-traverse, focal-plane shutter
- Shutter speed range: 1/8000 – 30 sec, BULB
- Continuous shooting: 5 frame/s

Viewfinder
- Viewfinder: Built-in 2.4 million dots OLED Electronic viewfinder

General
- Video recording: 1920×1080 (60p, 60i, 24p), 1440×1080 (30p), 640×480 (30p)
- LCD screen: 3.0 in (76 mm) Tilting XtraFine LCD, 921,600 pixels
- Battery: NP-FW50, InfoLITHIUM, 7.2 V, 1080 mAh, 7.7 Wh, Lithium-Ion rechargeable battery
- Dimensions: 127×94×48 mm (5.0×3.7×1.9 in)
- Weight: Approx. 474 g (16.7 oz) (camera body, card and battery)

Chronology
- Successor: Sony α7 II Sony α7R II Sony α7S II Sony α7C II

The Sony α7, α7R, α7S and α7C are four closely related families of full-frame mirrorless interchangeable-lens cameras. The first two were announced in October 2013, the third in April 2014 and the fourth in September 2020. The α7 series was the first full-frame mirrorless interchangeable lens camera on the market. They share the E-mount with the company's smaller sensor NEX series.

The α7 II was announced in November 2014, and is the first in the family to revise the original body and ergonomics. The α7C introduced an even more compact form factor, being the smallest full-frame camera with in-body image stabilization. The α7 series is targeted at experienced users, enthusiasts and professionals.

The Sony α7 and α7R have the model numbers ILCE-7 and ILCE-7R respectively. In addition, the α7S, the α7 II, and the α7R II have the model numbers ILCE-7S, ILCE-7M2, and ILCE-7RM2. Sony's new model naming prefix strives to unify model names. "ILC" stands for Interchangeable Lens Camera, followed by an indicator of A-mount "A" or E-mount "E".

Pre-announcement rumours speculated that the new camera would be named "Sony NEX-9".

== Variations ==
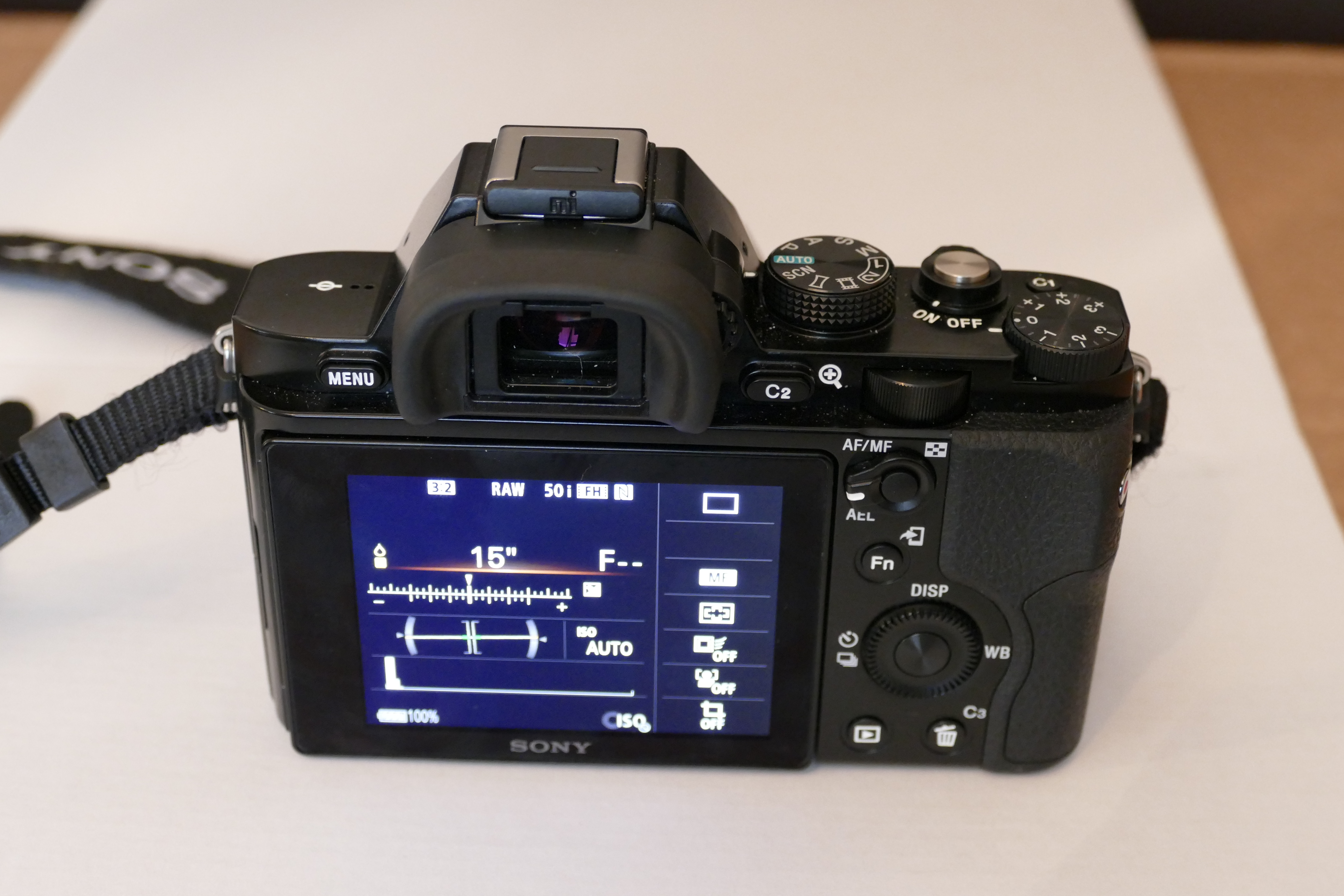
Sony A7 rear

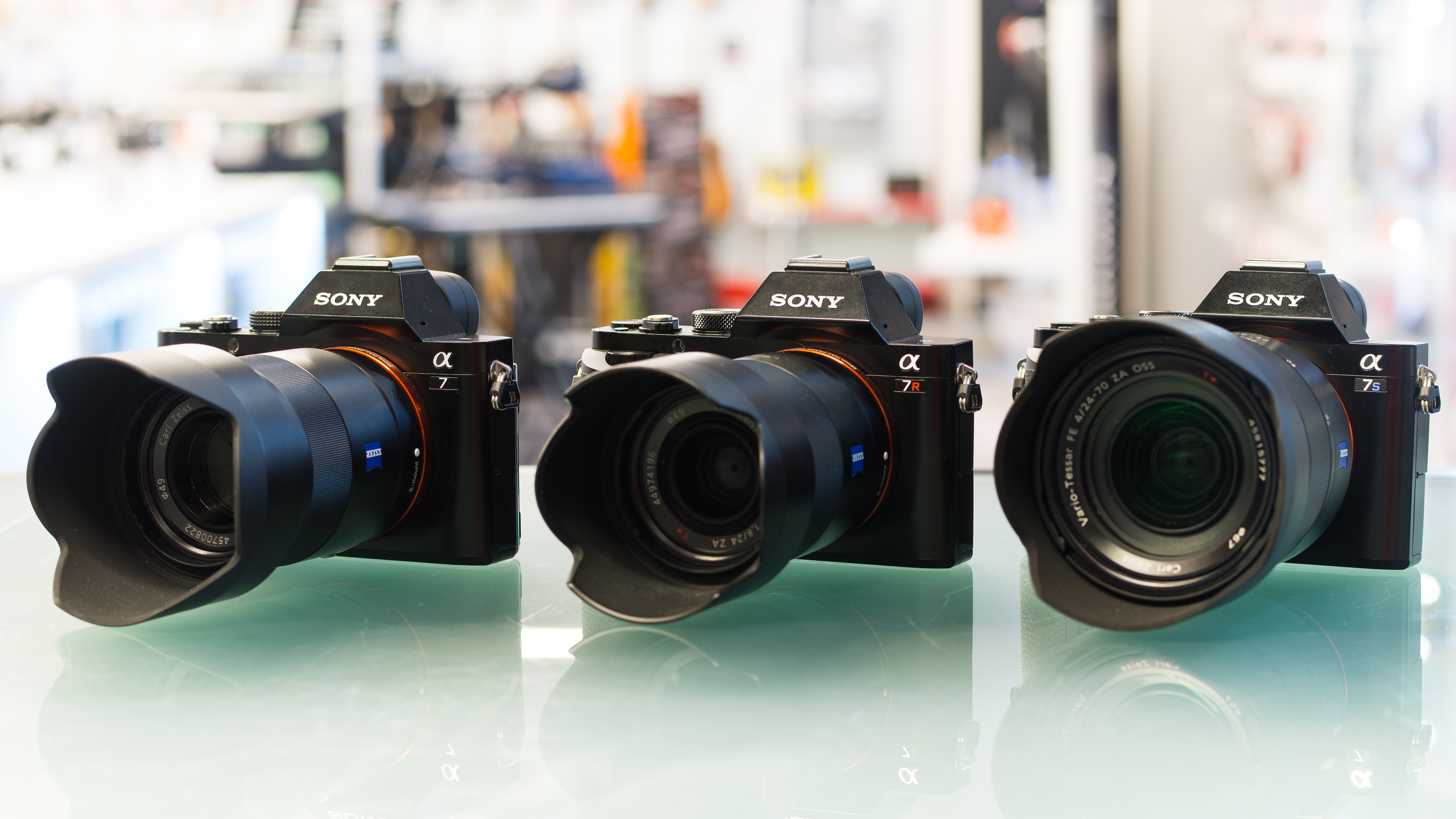
All three cameras of the first A7 generation: A7, A7R, A7S side by side

From 2014-2015, Sony released the second generation of the α7 series. The α7 II (ILCE-7M2), α7R II (ILCE-7RM2) and α7S II (ILCE-7SM2). Sony continues to produce the first generation models α7 and α7S, even three years after the launch, only the α7 has been discontinued in April 2019.

The basic α7 II model has 24 MP and has manual focus and hybrid autofocus.

The second generation common ground is the newer and improved body design as well as the world's first five-axis sensor-shift image stabilization system for a full-frame ILC. Sony claims that this can compensate a 4.5-stop equivalent of camera shake. In-body stabilization requires no special lens features, and mirrorless system cameras can typically accommodate lenses from any SLR system. As an upgrade of the α7, the α7 II has the same 50 Mbit XAVC-S codec as the α7S but lacks 4K video, and the five-axis stabilization is less effective in video mode than that used in the Olympus OM-D E-M1. However, the crop mode used in the α7 II does not incur "very much loss in image quality", unlike that of the Nikon D750.

On 14 June 2015, Hasselblad announced the Lusso, a variant of the Sony α7R marketed by Hasselblad.

The third generation started in 2017, and the fourth was announced in July 2019.

== Model differences ==
| Model | α7 | α7R | α7S | α7 II | α7R II | α7S II | α7R III (A) | α7 III | α7R IV (A) | α7S III | α7C | α7 IV | α7R V | α7C II | α7CR | α7 V | α7R VI |
|---|---|---|---|---|---|---|---|---|---|---|---|---|---|---|---|---|---|
| Product standing | Basic | High Resolution | High Sensitivity | Basic Mark II | High Resolution Mark II | High Sensitivity Mark II | High Resolution Mark III | Basic Mark III | High Resolution Mark IV | High Sensitivity Mark III | Compact | Basic Mark IV | High Resolution Mark V | Compact Mark II | High Resolution Compact | Basic Mark V | High Resolution Mark VI |
| Announced | 16 Oct 2013 | | 6 Apr 2014 | 20 Nov 2014 | 10 June 2015 | 11 Sept 2015 | 25 Oct 2017 | 26 Feb 2018 | 16 Jul 2019 | 28 Jul 2020 | 15 Sep 2020 | 21 Oct 2021 | 26 Oct 2022 | 29 Aug 2023 | | 02 Dec 2025 | Jun 2026 |
| Sensor resolution at Full Format | 24.3 MP Exmor CMOS; 6000 × 4000 pixels | 36.4 MP Exmor CMOS; 7360 × 4912 pixels | 12.2 MP Exmor CMOS; 4240 × 2832 pixels | 24.3 MP Exmor CMOS; 6000 × 4000 pixels | 42.4 MP Exmor R BSI-CMOS; 7952 × 5304 pixels | 12.2 MP Exmor CMOS; 4240 × 2832 pixels | 42.4 MP Exmor R BSI-CMOS; 7952 × 5304 pixels | 24.2 MP Exmor R BSI-CMOS sensor 6000 × 4000 pixels | 61.0 MP Exmor R BSI-CMOS sensor 9504 × 6336 pixels | 12.1 MP Exmor R BSI-CMOS sensor 4240 × 2832 pixels | 24.2 MP Exmor R BSI-CMOS sensor 6000 × 4000 pixels | 33.0 MP Exmor R BSI-CMOS sensor 7008 × 4672 pixels | 61.0 MP Exmor R BSI-CMOS sensor 9504 × 6336 pixels | 33.0 MP Exmor R BSI-CMOS sensor 7008 × 4672 pixels | 61.0 MP Exmor R BSI-CMOS sensor 9504 × 6336 pixels | 33.0 MP Exmor RS BSI-CMOS sensor 7008 × 4672 pixels | 66.8 MP Exmor RS BSI-CMOS sensor 9984 × 6656 pixels |
| Processor | BIONZ X | | | | | | | | | BIONZ XR | BIONZ X | BIONZ XR | | | | BIONZ XR2 | |
| ISO range | Expanded ISO 50-25600 Multi frame NR 100-51200 | Expanded ISO 50-25600 Multi frame NR 100-51200 | Native ISO 100-102400 Expanded ISO 50-409600 | Expanded ISO 50-25600 Multi frame NR 100-51200 | Native ISO 100-25600 Expanded ISO 50-102400 | Native ISO 100-102400 Expanded ISO 50-409600 | Native ISO 100-32000 Expanded ISO 50-102400 | Native ISO 100-51200 Expanded ISO 50-204800 | Native ISO 100-32000 Expanded ISO 50-102400 | Native ISO 80-102400 Expanded ISO 40-409600 | Native ISO 100-51200 Expanded ISO 50-204800 | | Native ISO 100-32000 Expanded ISO 50-102400 | Native ISO 100-51200 Expanded ISO 50-204800 (Stills), 100-102400 (Video) | Native ISO 100-32000 Expanded ISO 50-102400 (Stills), None (Video) | Native ISO 100-51200 Expanded ISO 50-204800 | Native ISO 100-32000 Expanded ISO 50-102400 |
| Autofocus | 25 points CD-AF w/ 117 points PD-AF | 25 points CD-AF | | 25 points CD-AF w/ 117 points PD-AF | 25 points CD-AF w/ 399 points PD-AF | 169 points CD-AF | 425 points CD-AF w/ 399 points PD-AF | 425 points CD-AF w/ 693 points PD-AF | 425 points CD-AF w/ 567 points PD-AF | 425 points CD-AF w/ 759 points PD-AF | 425 points CD-AF w/ 693 points PD-AF | 425 points CD-AF w/ 759 points PD-AF | 425 points CD-AF w/ 693 points PD-AF | Stills: 759 points hybrid Video: 627 points hybrid | Stills & Video: 693 points hybrid | 425 points CD-AF w/ 759 points PD-AF | 425 points CD-AF w/ 759 points PD-AF |
| Maximum flash sync speed | 1/250 | 1/160 | 1/250 | | | | | | | | 1/160 | 1/250 | | 1/160 (full frame); 1/200 (APS-C) | | 1/250; 1/320 s (APS-C) | |
| Max Continuous Shooting | 5 frame/s | 4 frame/s | 5 frame/s | | | | 10 frame/s | | | | | | | | 8 frame/s | 30 frame/s | |
| In-body image stabilization | No | | | 5-axis | | | | | | | | | | | | | |
| Flash Exposure Lock | No | | Yes | | | | | | | | | | | | | | |
| Shutter Speed | 1/8000 – 30s | | | | | | | | | | 1/4000 – 30 s e-Front Curtain only (1/8000 electronic) | 1/8000 – 30 s | | 1/4000 – 30 s e-Front Curtain only (1/8000 electronic) | | 1/8000 – 30 s (1/16000 electronic) | |
| Electronic shutter mode | First-curtain only | No | First-curtain, silent shutter | First-curtain only | First-curtain, silent shutter | | | | | | | | | | | | |
| Gapless on-chip lens | No | Yes | | No | Yes | | | | | | | | | | | | |
| Live-view Tethered Capture | No | | Yes | | | | | | Yes (wired and wireless) | | | | | | | | |
| Custom minimum shutter speed at Auto ISO | No | | | | Yes | | | | | | | | | | | | |
| Flexible Spot with Lock on AF | No | | | | Yes | | | | | | | | | | | | |
| Continuous Eye-AF | No | | | | Yes | | | | Yes (real-time tracking) | | | | | | | | |
| AF Sensitivity | 0 ~ 20 EV | | -4 ~ 20 EV | -1 ~ 20 EV | -2 ~ 20 EV | -4 ~ 20 EV | -3 ~ 20 EV | | | -6 ~ 20 EV | -4 ~ 20 EV | | | | | | |
| Metering Sensitivity | 0 ~ 20 EV | | -3 ~ 20 EV | -1 ~ 20 EV | -3 ~ 20 EV | | | | | | | | | | | | |
| User Custom Buttons | 3 | | | 4 | | | | | | | 1 | 4+Dial | | | | | |
| Programmable settings | No | | | Yes | | | | | | | | | | | | | |
| Monitor pixels | 921.6 K | | | 1,228.8 K | | | 1,444 K 2,359.2K(A7RM3A) | 921.6 K | 1,444 K 2,359.2K(A7RM4A) | 1,444 K | 921.6 K | 1,036 K | 2,095 K | 1,036 K | | 2,095 K | |
| Touch Panel | No | | | | | | Yes | | | Yes (fully touch menu system) | Yes | Yes (fully touch menu system) | | | | | |
| Viewfinder dots | 2.4 M | | | | | | 3.68 M | 2.4 M | 5.76 M | 9.43 M | 2.4 M | 3.68 M | 9.43 M | 2.4 M | | 3.68 M | 9.43 M |
| Viewfinder Resolution | XGA (1024 × 768 pixels) | | | | | | Quad-VGA (1280 × 960 pixels) | XGA (1024 × 768 pixels) | UXGA (1600 × 1200 pixels) | Quad-XGA (2048 × 1536 pixels) | XGA (1024 × 768 pixels) | Quad-VGA (1280 × 960 pixels) | Quad-XGA (2048 × 1536 pixels) | XGA (1024 × 768 pixels) | | Quad-VGA (1280 × 960 pixels) | Quad-XGA (2048 × 1536 pixels) |
| Viewfinder Magnification | 0.71× | | | | 0.78× | | | | | 0.90× | 0.59× | 0.78× | 0.90× | 0.70× | | 0.78× | |
| Memory card slot | 1 (Memory Stick Duo/SD) | | | | | | 2 (slot 1: SD; slot 2: Memory Stick Duo/SD) | | | 2 (both slots: SD/CFexpress Type A) | 1 (SD only) | 2 (slot 1: SD/CFexpress Type A; slot 2: SD) | 2 (both slots: SD/CFexpress Type A) | 1 (SD only) | | 2 (slot 1: SD/CFexpress Type A; slot 2: SD) | 2 (both slots: SD/CFexpress Type A) |
| Video record format | MPEG-4, AVCHD (28 Mbit/s); 1080p | | MPEG-4, AVCHD (28 Mbit/s), XAVC S (50 Mbit/s) 1080p | | MPEG-4, AVCHD (28 Mbit/s), XAVC S (100 Mbit/s) 4K video | | | | | MPEG-4, XAVC S, H.265 (280 Mbit/s), MPEG-4, XAVC S, H.264 (100 Mbit/s) 4K video | MPEG-4, AVCHD (28 Mbit/s), XAVC S (100 Mbit/s) 4K video | XAVC S, XAVC HS, XAVC S-I | | | | | |
| Video sampling | Line skipping | | Full-pixel readout | Line skipping | Pixel-binning at Full Format; Full-pixel readout at Super 35 | Full-pixel readout | | | | | | | | | | | |
| Slow motion video record | No | | Yes (720p, 120fps) | No | Yes (720p, 120fps) | Yes (1080p, 120fps) | | | | Yes (4K, 120fps) | Yes (1080p, 120fps) | | | | | Yes (1080p@240fps, 4K@60fps) | Yes (1080p@240fps, 4K@60fps) |
| HDMI Output | 4K still and 1080p video | | 4K still and 4K video | 4K still and 1080p video | 8K still and 4K video | 4K still and 4K video | 8K still and 4K video | 4K still and 4K video | 8K still and 4K video | 4K still and 4K video | 8K still and 4K video | | | | | | |
| Video Light mode | No | | Yes | No | Yes | | | | | | | | | | | | |
| Professional Video edit | No | | Picture Profile w/CineGamma, Timecode, Userbit | | | | | | | | | | | | | | |
| Other features | Hybrid autofocus system | No optical Low-pass filter | Full-pixel readout video at Full Format | Hybrid autofocus system | Hybrid autofocus system, No optical Low-pass filter | Full-pixel readout video at Full Format | | | | | | | | | | | |
| Lossless RAW | No (11+7 bit lossy RAW) | | | Yes, uncompressed (2.0 firmware update) | | Yes, uncompressed | | | | | | Yes, compressed or uncompressed | | | | Yes, compressed | Yes, compressed or uncompressed |
| Star Eater | Only in Bulb mode | | | | Only at 4s and above after Fw2.10, upgraded algorithm after Fw4.0, not present in continuous shooting mode | | Only at 4s and above, upgraded algorithm | | | | | | | | | | |
| PD-AF w/ adapted lens | Only A-mount lenses w/ LA-EA2 and LA-EA4 | | | Yes (Firmware update) | Yes | Only w/ LA-EA2/4 | Yes | | | | | | | | | | |
| Operate while USB charging | No | | | | Yes | | | Yes w/ Tethering | | | | | | | | | |
| Battery Life (CIPA standards) | 340 shots | 340 shots | 380 shots | 350 shots | 340 shots | 370 shots | 530 shots (EVF) / 650 shots (Monitor); 640 shots (Monitor on A7RM3A) | 610 shots (EVF) / 710 shots (Monitor) | 530 shots (EVF) / 670 shots (Monitor); 660 shots (Monitor on A7RM4A) | 510 shots (EVF) / 600 shots (Monitor) | 680 shots (EVF) / 740 shots (Monitor) | | | Stills: 530 shots (EVF) / 560 shots (Monitor) Continuous video recording: 165 minutes (EVF or monitor) | Stills: 490 shots (EVF) / 530 shots (Monitor) Continuous video recording: 155 minutes (EVF or monitor) | Stills: 630 shots (EVF) / 750 shots (Monitor) Continuous video recording: 210 minutes (EVF or monitor) | Stills: 600 shots (EVF) / 710 shots (Monitor) Continuous video recording: 210 minutes (EVF or monitor) |
| Body material | Combi. of magnesium alloy and polycarbonate | Full magnesium alloy chassis and polycarb bayonet mount. | Full magnesium alloy chassis and stainless steel bayonet mount. | | | | | | | | Magnesium alloy used for the top, front, and rear covers | | | | | | |
| Weight (w/ battery and media) | 416 g (474 g) | 407 g (465 g) | 446 g (489 g) | 556 g (599 g) | 582 g (625 g) | 584 g (627 g) | 572 g (657 g) | 565 g (650 g) | 578 g (665 g) | 614 g (699 g) | 424 g (509 g) | 573 g (658 g) | (723 g) | 429 g (514 g) | 430 g (515 g) | 610 g (695 g) | 622 g (713 g) |
| Dimension | 126.9 × 94.4 × 54.8 mm | | | 126.9 × 95.7 × 59.7 mm | 126.9 × 95.7 × 60.3 mm | | 126.9 × 95.6 × 73.7 mm | | 128.9 × 96.4 × 77.5 mm | 128.9 × 96.9 × 80.8 mm | 124 × 71.1 × 59.7 mm | 131.3 × 96.4 × 79.8 mm | 131.3 x 96.9 x 82.4 mm | 124.0 x 71.1 x 63.4 mm | | 130.3 x 96.4 x 82.4 mm | 132.7 × 96.9 × 82.9 mm |
| Discontinued | Dec 2019 | | | | | | | | | | | | | | | | |

== BIONZ ==
BIONZ is a line of image processors used in Sony digital cameras. It is currently used in many Sony α DSLR and mirrorless cameras. Image processing in the camera converts the raw data from a CCD or CMOS image sensor into the format that is stored on the memory card. This processing is one of the bottlenecks in digital camera speed, so manufacturers put much effort into making, and marketing, the fastest processors for this step that they can.

Sony designs the circuitry of the processor in-house, and outsources the manufacturing to semiconductor foundries such as MegaChips and (mostly) GlobalFoundries, as they currently do not own any fabrication plant capable of producing a system on a chip (SoC).[1] Sony also sources DRAM chips from various manufacturers namely Samsung, SK Hynix and Micron Technology.

BIONZ utilizes two chips in its design. The first chip is an SoC that manages overall functionality of the camera such as SD card storage management, wired connection such as USB and HDMI, and wireless protocols such as Wi-Fi and NFC that are increasingly common on modern Sony α cameras. The BIONZ SoC can be identified by its part number "CXD900xx". The second chip is the ISP (image signal processor). It handles the data directly from the CMOS image sensor, and it is directly responsible for the camera's high-ISO noise characteristics in a low-light environment. The ISP can be identified by the part number "CXD4xxx".

== Features (universal for α7-series) ==
- Exmor CMOS full-frame sensor (with different megapixels depending on camera version)
- TruBlack XtraFine LCD screen (3 inch/7.5 cm) with tilt functionality
- 1.3 cm (0.5 inch) electronic viewfinder
- 1200-zone evaluative light metering
- Built-in Wi-Fi and NFC
- LED-auto focus illuminator
- Multi Interface Shoe (α7R IV adds digital audio interface)
- 9+1 customizable buttons (10+1 starting with second generation) / 45+ assignable functions

== Critical reception and awards ==
The Sony α (Alpha) cameras, particularly the α7 and α7R models, garnered widespread acclaim from critics and industry experts. DxOMark, a reputable source for camera and lens evaluations, crowned the α7R as the highest ranking full-frame mirrorless camera, with a score of 95 (the same score as the Nikon D800, but one point behind the Nikon D800E). The α7 achieved a score of 90, higher than the Nikon Df and Nikon D4 professional DSLR cameras, and even Sony's own SLT-A99. The Verge rated the cameras 8.3 out of 10, commenting that "It might be a few years before we realize it, but when the DSLR is relegated to a niche status among specialty photographers and full-frame mirrorless cameras dominate the market, we'll have the α7's to thank as the cameras that started it all." EPhotozine which rated the α7 5 stars, meanwhile praised the α7 series' price point for making them "the cheapest full-frame digital cameras currently available" while being lighter and smaller than comparable cameras. It awarded the α7 "Camera of the Year". The α7R was awarded by Imaging Resource as the "Camera of the Year".

== See also ==
- Sony α7II
- Sony α6000
- List of Sony E-mount cameras
- List of lightest mirrorless cameras

| Family | Level | Format | '10 | 2011 | | 2012 | 2013 | 2014 | 2015 | 2016 | 2017 | 2018 | 2019 | 2020 | 2021 | 2022 | 2023 | 2024 | 2025 | 2026 |
|---|---|---|---|---|---|---|---|---|---|---|---|---|---|---|---|---|---|---|---|---|
| Alpha (α) | Indust | FF | | | | | | | | | | | | | | | | ILX-LR1 ^{●} | | |
| Alpha (α) | Cine line | FF | | | | | | | | | | | | | _{m} FX6 ^{●} | | | | | |
| Alpha (α) | Cine line | FF | | | | | | | | | | | | | | | | | | _{m} FX5 ^{AT●} |
| Alpha (α) | Cine line | FF | | | | | | | | | | | | | _{m} FX3 ^{AT●} | | | | | |
| Alpha (α) | Cine line | FF | | | | | | | | | | | | | | | | | | _{m} FX2 ^{AT●} |
| Alpha (α) | Flag | FF | | | | | | | | | | | | | _{m} α1 ^{FT●} | | | | _{m} α1 II ^{FAT●} | |
| Alpha (α) | Speed | FF | | | | | | | | | | _{m} α9 ^{FT●} | | | _{m} α9 II ^{FT●} | | | | _{m} α9 III ^{FAT●} | |
| Alpha (α) | Sens | FF | | | | | | | _{m} α7S ^{●} | _{m} α7S II ^{F●} | | | | | _{m} α7S III ^{AT●} | | | | | |
| Alpha (α) | Hi-Res | FF | | | | | | _{m} α7R ^{●} | | _{m} α7R II ^{F●} | | _{m} α7R III ^{FT●} | | _{m} α7R IV ^{FT●} | | | _{m} α7R V ^{FAT●} | | | _{m} α7R VI ^{FAT●} |
| Alpha (α) | Basic | FF | | | | | | _{m} α7 ^{F●} | _{m} α7 II ^{F●} | | | | _{m} α7 III ^{FT●} | | | _{m} α7 IV ^{AT●} | | | | _{m} α7 V ^{FAT●} |
| Alpha (α) | Compact | FF | | | | | | | | | | | | | | | | _{m} α7CR ^{AT●} | | |
| Alpha (α) | Compact | FF | | | | | | | | | | | | | _{m} α7C ^{AT●} | | | _{m} α7C II ^{AT●} | | |
| Alpha (α) | Vlog | FF | | | | | | | | | | | | | | | | _{m} ZV-E1 ^{AT●} | | |
| Alpha (α) | Cine | APS-C | | | | | | | | | | | | | | | _{m} FX30 ^{AT●} | | | |
| Alpha (α) | Adv | APS-C | | | _{s} NEX-7 ^{F●} | | | | | | _{m} α6500 ^{FT●} | | | _{m} α6600 ^{FT●} | | | | _{m} α6700 ^{AT●} | | |
| Alpha (α) | Mid-range | APS-C | | | | _{m} NEX-6 ^{F●} | | | | | _{m} α6300 ^{F●} | | _{m} α6400 ^{F+T●} | | | | | | | |
| Alpha (α) | Mid-range | APS-C | | | | | | _{m} α6000 ^{F●} | | | | | | _{m} α6100 ^{FT●} | | | | | | |
| Alpha (α) | Vlog | APS-C | | | | | | | | | | | | | | _{m} ZV-E10 ^{AT●} | | | _{m} ZV-E10 II ^{AT●} | |
| Alpha (α) | Entry-level | APS-C | NEX-5 ^{F●} | NEX-5N ^{FT●} | | NEX-5R ^{F+T●} | NEX-5T ^{F+T●} | | α5100 ^{F+T●} | | | | | | | | | | | |
| Alpha (α) | Entry-level | APS-C | NEX-3 ^{F●} | NEX-C3 ^{F●} | | NEX-F3 ^{F+●} | NEX-3N ^{F+●} | α5000 ^{F+●} | | | | | | | | | | | | |
| DSLR-style | | APS-C | | | | | _{m} α3000 ^{●} | | _{m} α3500 ^{●} | | | | | | | | | | | |
| SmartShot | | APS-C | | | | | | | QX1 ^{M●} | | | | | | | | | | | |
| CineAlta | Cine line | FF | | | | | | | | | | VENICE | | | | VENICE 2 | | | | |
| CineAlta | Cine line | FF | | | | | | | | | | | | | | | | BURANO | | |
| XDCAM | Cine line | FF | | | | | | | | | | | | _{m} FX9 | | | | | | |
| XDCAM | Docu | S35 | | | | | | | _{m} FS7 | | _{m} FS7 II | | | | | | | | | |
| XDCAM | Mobile | S35 | | | | | | | | _{m} FS5 | | | _{m} FS5 II | | | | | | | |
| NXCAM | Pro | S35 | | NEX-FS100 | | NEX-FS700 | NEX-FS700R | | | | | | | | | | | | | |
| NXCAM | APS-C | | | | | NEX-EA50 | | | | | | | | | | | | | | |
| Handycam | FF | | | | | _{m} NEX-VG900 | | | | | | | | | | | | | | |
| Handycam | APS-C | | _{s} NEX-VG10 | | _{s} NEX-VG20 | _{m} NEX-VG30 | | | | | | | | | | | | | | |
| Security | | FF | | | | | | | | | SNC-VB770 | | | | | | | | | |
| Security | | FF | | | | | | | | | UMC-S3C | | | | | | | | | |
| Family | Level | Format | | | | | | | | | | | | | | | | | | |
| Family | Level | Format | '10 | 2011 | | 2012 | 2013 | 2014 | 2015 | 2016 | 2017 | 2018 | 2019 | 2020 | 2021 | 2022 | 2023 | 2024 | 2025 | 2026 |
