= Bionz =

Sony image processors

BIONZ is a line of image processors used in Sony digital cameras.

It is currently used in many Sony α DSLR and mirrorless cameras. Image processing in the camera converts the raw data from a CCD or CMOS image sensor into the format that is stored on the memory card. This processing is one of the bottlenecks in digital camera speed, so manufacturers put much effort into making, and marketing, the fastest processors for this step that they can.

Sony designs the circuitry of the processor in-house, and outsources the manufacturing to semiconductor foundries such as MegaChips and (mostly) GlobalFoundries, as they currently do not own any fabrication plant capable of producing a system on a chip (SoC). Sony also sources DRAM chips from various manufacturers namely Samsung, SK Hynix and Micron Technology.

BIONZ utilizes two chips in its design. The first chip is an SoC that manages overall functionality of the camera such as SD card storage management, wired connection such as USB and HDMI, and wireless protocols such as Wi-Fi and NFC that are increasingly common on modern Sony α cameras. The BIONZ SoC can be identified by its part number "CXD900xx". The second chip is the ISP (image signal processor). It handles the data directly from the CMOS image sensor, and it is directly responsible for the camera's high-ISO noise characteristics in a low-light environment. The ISP can be identified by the part number "CXD4xxx".

== History of BIONZ chips in Sony cameras ==
=== BIONZ – MegaChips MA07170 and MA07171 ===
The first camera to officially use a so-called BIONZ processor was the DSLR-A700 in 2007, utilizing the MA07170 chip from a MegaChips (MCL) family of 32-bit RISC processors with MIPS R3000 core.

Similar MegaChips processors had been used in the DSLR-A100 (MA07169) as well as in the Konica Minolta 5D (MA07168) and 7D (MA07168), implementing Konica Minolta's CxProcess III running under MiSPO's NORTi/MIPS, an RTOS following the μITRON standard.

The MegaChips MA07170 was also used in the DSLR-A200, DSLR-A300, and DSLR-A350. The DSLR-A850 and DSLR-A900 used two such chips in parallel.

The MegaChips MA07171 was instead used in the DSLR-A230, DSLR-A290, DSLR-A330, DSLR-A380, and DSLR-A390.

=== BIONZ – Sony CXD4115 ISP ===
The first BIONZ processor to fully designed in-house by Sony utilized the Sony image processor in:

- CXD4115 ISP - DSLR-A450, DSLR-A500, DSLR-A550 - still using a proprietary operating system (most probably NORTi as well).
- CXD9974GG SoC with the revised CXD4115-1 ISP - DSLR-A560, DSLR-A580, SLT-A33, SLT-A35, SLT-A55 / SLT-A55V, NEX-5C, NEX-C3, and NEX-VG10 - all models from here on are Linux-based (CE Linux 6 with kernel 2.3.)

=== BIONZ – Sony CXD4132 ISP + CXD90016GF SoC ===
Sony CXD4132 series chip is a multicore BIONZ processor:

- CXD4132 - SLT-A37, SLT-A57, SLT-A58, SLT-A65 / SLT-A65V, SLT-A77 / SLT-A77V, SLT-A99 / SLT-A99V / HV, NEX-F3, NEX-3N, NEX-5N,
- CXD90016GF SoC with CXD4132 ISP - NEX-5R, NEX-5T, NEX-6, NEX-7 / Lunar
- Unidentified - NEX-VG20, NEX-VG30, NEX-VG900, NEX-FS100, DSC-RX1 / DSC-RX1R, DSC-RX100 / Stellar, DSC-RX100M2

=== BIONZ X – Sony CXD4236 ISP + CXD90027GF SoC ===
Sony has introduced their next-generation image processor dubbed the BIONZ X with introduction of ILCE-7 / ILCE-7R in 2013. BIONZ X uses Sony CXD4236 series ISP along with CXD90027GF SoC. The latter is based on a quad-core ARM Cortex-A5 architecture, and is utilized to run Android apps on top of the Linux kernel.

It features, among other things, detail reproduction technology and diffraction-reducing technology, area-specific noise reduction and 16-bit image processing + 14-bit raw output. It can process up to 20 frames per second and features Lock-on AF and object tracking.

- CXD90027GF SoC with unidentified ISP (Stacked DRAM) - α7, α7R, α7 II, α6000, α6500, α99, α7 III
- CXD90027GF SoC with CXD4236-1GG ISP - α7S, α7S II, RX100 IV, Sony FDR-AX33
- CXD90027GF SoC with Dual CXD4236-1GG ISP - α7R II, α7R III
- Unidentified - ILCE-5000, DSC-RX10, ILCA-77M2, DSC-RX100 III, α7R IV, and DSC-RX0

=== BIONZ XR ===
Sony has introduced its next-generation image processor dubbed the BIONZ XR with the introduction of Sony α7S III in 2020. "The sensor is to have eight times as much computing power as the previous image processor." It is also used in the Sony α1 flagship mirrorless camera and its successor the Sony α1 II, Sony FX6, Sony FX3 compact cinema camera, Sony α7 IV mirrorless camera launched in 2021 as well as the Sony A7CII and APS-C Sony a6700 which both launched in 2023.

New Features

- New video codecs / framerates.
- New downsampling power in the camera.
- Internal Pipeline speed improvements.
- Laggy interface fix.
- New card formats/interface.
- New EVF resolution/ readout speed
- Fix of the viewfinder lag during AF or continuous shooting

=== BIONZ XR2 ===
Sony has introduced its next-generation image processor dubbed the BIONZ XR2 with the introduction of Sony α7 V in 2025. In their marketing, Sony claims "The BIONZ XR2 processing engine which integrates the AI processing unit of the latest α™ series delivers vast improvements in image and sound quality, and overall operation."

== See also ==
- Expeed – Nikon's image processors
- DIGIC – Canon's image processors
- Image processor

Level	Sensor	2004	2005	2006	2007	2008	2009	2010	2011		2012	2013	2014	2015	2016	2017	2018	2019	2020
Professional	Full frame						α900					α99				α99 II			
Professional	Full frame							α850											
High-end	APS-C		DG-7D			α700				α77				α77 II					
Midrange	APS-C									α65					α68				
Upper-entry	APS-C								α55		α57								
Upper-entry	APS-C				α100			α550 ^{F}	α580				α58						
Upper-entry	APS-C		DG-5D					α500	α560										
Upper-entry	APS-C							α450											
Entry-level	APS-C								α33	α35	α37								
Entry-level	APS-C					α350 ^{F}		α380	α390										
Entry-level	APS-C					α300		α330											
Entry-level	APS-C					α200		α230	α290										
Early models	Minolta 7000 with SB-70/SB-70S (1986) · Minolta 9000 with SB-90/SB-90S (1986) (Still video SLRs); Minolta MS-C1100 (1992) · Minolta RD-175 (1995)																		
Level	Sensor																		
Level	Sensor	2004	2005	2006	2007	2008	2009	2010	2011		2012	2013	2014	2015	2016	2017	2018	2019	2020

Family	Level	Format	'10	2011		2012	2013	2014	2015	2016	2017	2018	2019	2020	2021	2022	2023	2024	2025	2026
Alpha (α)	Indust	FF																ILX-LR1 ^{●}		
Alpha (α)	Cine line	FF													_{m} FX6 ^{●}					
Alpha (α)	Cine line	FF																		_{m} FX5 ^{AT●}
Alpha (α)	Cine line	FF													_{m} FX3 ^{AT●}					
Alpha (α)	Cine line	FF																		_{m} FX2 ^{AT●}
Alpha (α)	Flag	FF													_{m} α1 ^{FT●}				_{m} α1 II ^{FAT●}	
Alpha (α)	Speed	FF										_{m} α9 ^{FT●}			_{m} α9 II ^{FT●}				_{m} α9 III ^{FAT●}	
Alpha (α)	Sens	FF							_{m} α7S ^{●}	_{m} α7S II ^{F●}					_{m} α7S III ^{AT●}					
Alpha (α)	Hi-Res	FF						_{m} α7R ^{●}		_{m} α7R II ^{F●}		_{m} α7R III ^{FT●}		_{m} α7R IV ^{FT●}			_{m} α7R V ^{FAT●}			_{m} α7R VI ^{FAT●}
Alpha (α)	Basic	FF						_{m} α7 ^{F●}	_{m} α7 II ^{F●}				_{m} α7 III ^{FT●}			_{m} α7 IV ^{AT●}				_{m} α7 V ^{FAT●}
Alpha (α)	Compact	FF																_{m} α7CR ^{AT●}		
Alpha (α)	Compact	FF													_{m} α7C ^{AT●}			_{m} α7C II ^{AT●}		
Alpha (α)	Vlog	FF																_{m} ZV-E1 ^{AT●}		
Alpha (α)	Cine	APS-C															_{m} FX30 ^{AT●}			
Alpha (α)	Adv	APS-C			_{s} NEX-7 ^{F●}						_{m} α6500 ^{FT●}			_{m} α6600 ^{FT●}				_{m} α6700 ^{AT●}		
Alpha (α)	Mid-range	APS-C				_{m} NEX-6 ^{F●}					_{m} α6300 ^{F●}		_{m} α6400 ^{F+T●}							
Alpha (α)	Mid-range	APS-C						_{m} α6000 ^{F●}						_{m} α6100 ^{FT●}						
Alpha (α)	Vlog	APS-C														_{m} ZV-E10 ^{AT●}			_{m} ZV-E10 II ^{AT●}	
Alpha (α)	Entry-level	APS-C	NEX-5 ^{F●}	NEX-5N ^{FT●}		NEX-5R ^{F+T●}	NEX-5T ^{F+T●}		α5100 ^{F+T●}											
Alpha (α)	Entry-level	APS-C	NEX-3 ^{F●}	NEX-C3 ^{F●}		NEX-F3 ^{F+●}	NEX-3N ^{F+●}	α5000 ^{F+●}												
DSLR-style		APS-C					_{m} α3000 ^{●}		_{m} α3500 ^{●}											
SmartShot		APS-C							QX1 ^{M●}											
CineAlta	Cine line	FF										VENICE				VENICE 2				
CineAlta	Cine line	FF																BURANO		
XDCAM	Cine line	FF												_{m} FX9						
XDCAM	Docu	S35							_{m} FS7		_{m} FS7 II									
XDCAM	Mobile	S35								_{m} FS5			_{m} FS5 II							
NXCAM	Pro	S35		NEX-FS100		NEX-FS700	NEX-FS700R													
NXCAM	APS-C					NEX-EA50														
Handycam	FF					_{m} NEX-VG900														
Handycam	APS-C		_{s} NEX-VG10		_{s} NEX-VG20	_{m} NEX-VG30														
Security		FF									SNC-VB770									
Security		FF									UMC-S3C									
Family	Level	Format																		
Family	Level	Format	'10	2011		2012	2013	2014	2015	2016	2017	2018	2019	2020	2021	2022	2023	2024	2025	2026
