= Sony α7 V =

2025 full-frame mirrorless camera

Overview
- Maker: Sony
- Type: Full-frame mirrorless interchangeable-lens camera
- Released: 2 December 2025; 11 months ago
- Intro price: US$2,898 body only, US$3,099 with 20-70mm kit lens

Lens
- Lens mount: Sony E-mount
- Lens: Interchangeable
- Compatible lenses: Full-Frame and APS-C E-mount lenses

Sensor/medium
- Sensor type: BSI-CMOS
- Sensor size: 35.9 × 23.9 mm (Full frame type)
- Sensor maker: Sony Semiconductor Manufacturing Corporation
- Maximum resolution: 7008 × 4672 (33 megapixels)
- Recording medium: SD, SDHC, SDXC, CF Express Type A memory card

Focusing
- Focus areas: 759 focus points

Flash
- Flash: No
- Flash synchronization: 1/250 second (Full-frame), 1/320 second (APS-C size)
- Flash bracketing: Sony MI-Shoe Mount

Shutter
- Shutter: Mechanical, Electronic
- Shutter speeds: 1/8000 s to 30 s, Bulb
- Continuous shooting: 30 frames per second

Viewfinder
- Viewfinder: Yes, 1.3 cm (0.5 type) with 3.68M dots, Electronic viewfinder
- Viewfinder magnification: Approx. 0.78× with 50 mm lens at infinity
- Frame coverage: 100%

Image processing
- Image processor: BIONZ XR2

General
- LCD screen: 80 mm (3.2-type) with 2.1M dots
- Battery: NP-FZ100 Lithium-Ion rechargeable battery USB-PD rechargeable
- AV port: HDMI (Type A)
- Data port(s): USB 2.0 Type-C, USB 10Gbps (USB-C), Wi-Fi 6E, Bluetooth 5.3
- Dimensions: 130.3 by 96.4 by 82.4 mm (5.13 by 3.80 by 3.24 in)
- Weight: 695 g (25 oz) (1.532 lb) including battery and memory card
- Made in: Thailand

Chronology
- Predecessor: Sony α7 IV

References
- "ILCE-7M5 Specifications | Sony USA". www.sony.com. Sony Electronics Inc.

The Sony α7 V (model ILCE-7M5) is a full-frame mirrorless interchangeable-lens camera manufactured by Sony. It was announced on 2 December 2025 as the successor to the Sony α7 IV. Featuring a new partially stacked 33 MP Exmor RS CMOS sensor, the latest BIONZ XR2 processing engine with integrated AI unit, blackout-free 30 fps continuous shooting, and 7K oversampled 4K 60p recording with full pixel readout and no pixel binning.

== Features ==
The α7 V brings several improvements over its predecessor, the α7 IV:

- 33MP full-frame partially stacked Exmor RS CMOS sensor
- Newly developed BIONZ XR2 processor with built-in AI engine
- 7K oversampled 4K 60p recording with full pixel readout, no binning
- 4K 120p recording (only available in the APS-C/Super 35mm mode)
- Blackout-free 30 fps continuous shooting with full AF/AE
- 5-axis IBIS offering up to 7.5-step central / 6.5-step peripheral stabilization
- Deep learning based light source estimation for accurate white balance
- Real-time Recognition AF with advanced human pose estimation
- Wider subject detection: human, animal, bird, insect, car/train, airplane
- 759-point focal-plane phase-detection AF across ~94% of the frame
- Pre-Capture (records moments before shutter release)
- S-Log3 and advanced post-production workflow support
- 4-axis multi-angle LCD touchscreen + orientation-adaptive info display
- 3.68-million-dot Quad-VGA OLED EVF
- Improved grip design and refined ergonomics
- Two USB-C ports (including USB 10Gbps & USB Power Delivery support respectively)
- Dual card slots with CFexpress Type A support
- Dust and moisture-resistant magnesium-alloy body
- Effective heat dissipation and improved power efficiency

Family	Level	Format	'10	2011		2012	2013	2014	2015	2016	2017	2018	2019	2020	2021	2022	2023	2024	2025	2026
Alpha (α)	Indust	FF																ILX-LR1 ^{●}		
Alpha (α)	Cine line	FF													_{m} FX6 ^{●}					
Alpha (α)	Cine line	FF																		_{m} FX5 ^{AT●}
Alpha (α)	Cine line	FF													_{m} FX3 ^{AT●}					
Alpha (α)	Cine line	FF																		_{m} FX2 ^{AT●}
Alpha (α)	Flag	FF													_{m} α1 ^{FT●}				_{m} α1 II ^{FAT●}	
Alpha (α)	Speed	FF										_{m} α9 ^{FT●}			_{m} α9 II ^{FT●}				_{m} α9 III ^{FAT●}	
Alpha (α)	Sens	FF							_{m} α7S ^{●}	_{m} α7S II ^{F●}					_{m} α7S III ^{AT●}					
Alpha (α)	Hi-Res	FF						_{m} α7R ^{●}		_{m} α7R II ^{F●}		_{m} α7R III ^{FT●}		_{m} α7R IV ^{FT●}			_{m} α7R V ^{FAT●}			_{m} α7R VI ^{FAT●}
Alpha (α)	Basic	FF						_{m} α7 ^{F●}	_{m} α7 II ^{F●}				_{m} α7 III ^{FT●}			_{m} α7 IV ^{AT●}				_{m} α7 V ^{FAT●}
Alpha (α)	Compact	FF																_{m} α7CR ^{AT●}		
Alpha (α)	Compact	FF													_{m} α7C ^{AT●}			_{m} α7C II ^{AT●}		
Alpha (α)	Vlog	FF																_{m} ZV-E1 ^{AT●}		
Alpha (α)	Cine	APS-C															_{m} FX30 ^{AT●}			
Alpha (α)	Adv	APS-C			_{s} NEX-7 ^{F●}						_{m} α6500 ^{FT●}			_{m} α6600 ^{FT●}				_{m} α6700 ^{AT●}		
Alpha (α)	Mid-range	APS-C				_{m} NEX-6 ^{F●}					_{m} α6300 ^{F●}		_{m} α6400 ^{F+T●}							
Alpha (α)	Mid-range	APS-C						_{m} α6000 ^{F●}						_{m} α6100 ^{FT●}						
Alpha (α)	Vlog	APS-C														_{m} ZV-E10 ^{AT●}			_{m} ZV-E10 II ^{AT●}	
Alpha (α)	Entry-level	APS-C	NEX-5 ^{F●}	NEX-5N ^{FT●}		NEX-5R ^{F+T●}	NEX-5T ^{F+T●}		α5100 ^{F+T●}											
Alpha (α)	Entry-level	APS-C	NEX-3 ^{F●}	NEX-C3 ^{F●}		NEX-F3 ^{F+●}	NEX-3N ^{F+●}	α5000 ^{F+●}												
DSLR-style		APS-C					_{m} α3000 ^{●}		_{m} α3500 ^{●}											
SmartShot		APS-C							QX1 ^{M●}											
CineAlta	Cine line	FF										VENICE				VENICE 2				
CineAlta	Cine line	FF																BURANO		
XDCAM	Cine line	FF												_{m} FX9						
XDCAM	Docu	S35							_{m} FS7		_{m} FS7 II									
XDCAM	Mobile	S35								_{m} FS5			_{m} FS5 II							
NXCAM	Pro	S35		NEX-FS100		NEX-FS700	NEX-FS700R													
NXCAM	APS-C					NEX-EA50														
Handycam	FF					_{m} NEX-VG900														
Handycam	APS-C		_{s} NEX-VG10		_{s} NEX-VG20	_{m} NEX-VG30														
Security		FF									SNC-VB770									
Security		FF									UMC-S3C									
Family	Level	Format																		
Family	Level	Format	'10	2011		2012	2013	2014	2015	2016	2017	2018	2019	2020	2021	2022	2023	2024	2025	2026
