= Sony α7R III =

2017 full-frame mirrorless camera

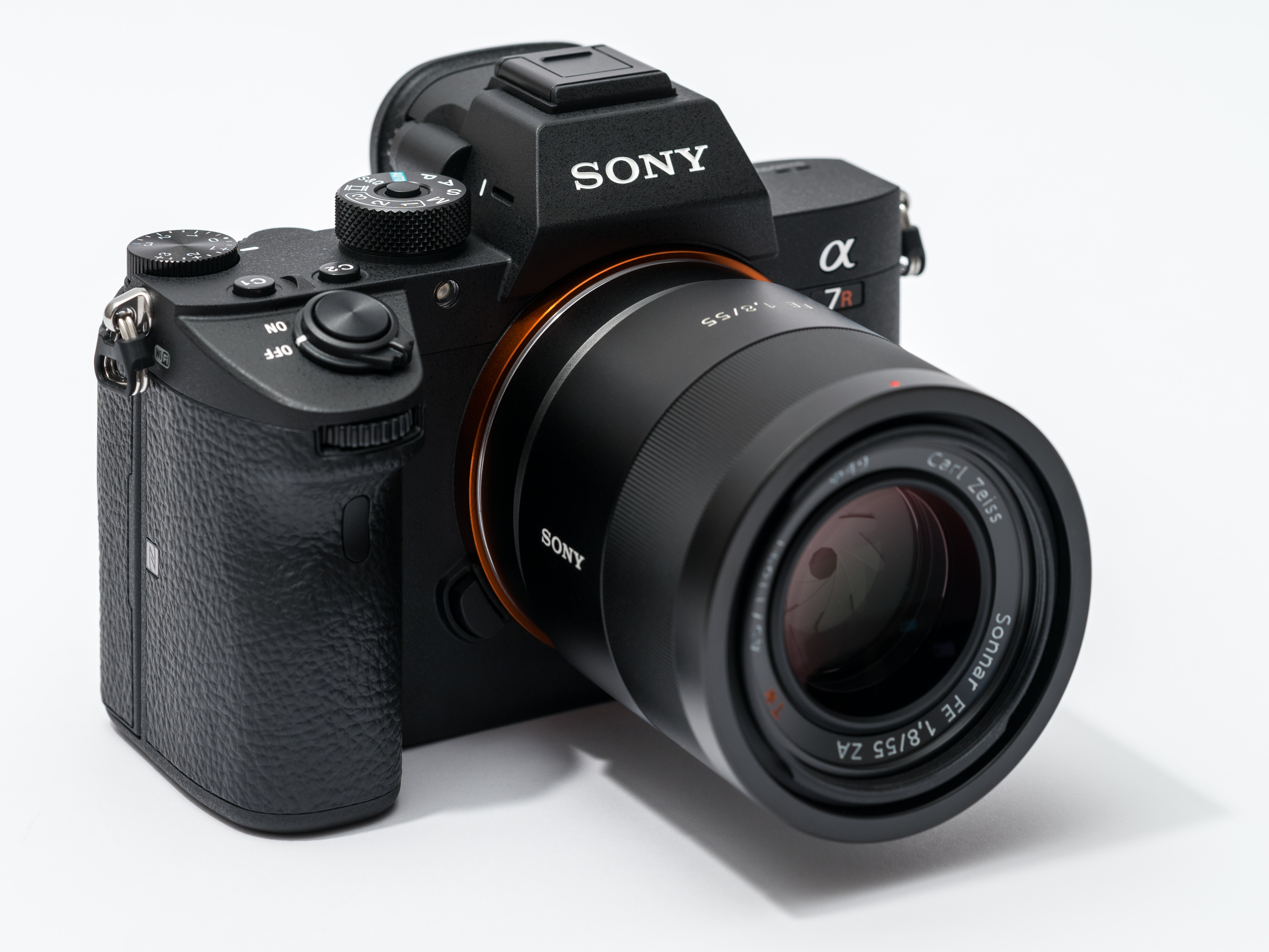

Overview
- Maker: Sony

Lens
- Lens mount: Sony E-mount

Sensor/medium
- Sensor type: BSI-CMOS
- Sensor size: 35.9 × 24 mm (Full frame type)
- Maximum resolution: 7952 × 5304 (42 megapixels)
- Film speed: ISO 100–32000 (expandable to ISO 50–102400) (still images); ISO 100–12800 (movies)
- Recording medium: SD, SDHC, or SDXC memory card

Focusing
- Focus areas: 425 focus points

Flash
- Flash: no

Shutter
- Shutter speeds: 1/8000 s to 30 s, BULB
- Continuous shooting: 10 frames per second

Viewfinder
- Viewfinder: EVF(Electronic View Finder)
- Viewfinder magnification: 0.78
- Frame coverage: 100%

Image processing
- Image processor: BIONZ X
- White balance: Yes

General
- Video recording: 4K video up to 30 fps
- LCD screen: 76 mm (3 in) with 1,440,000 dots
- Dimensions: 127 by 96 by 74 mm (5.0 by 3.8 by 2.9 in)
- Weight: 657 g (23 oz) including battery
- Made in: China

Chronology
- Replaced: Sony α7R II
- Successor: Sony α7R IV

The Sony α7R III (model ILCE-7RM3) is a full-frame mirrorless interchangeable-lens camera manufactured by Sony. It was announced on 25 October 2017 as the successor to the Sony α7R II launched two years prior. The camera shares many features with the α7R II, including the same 42.2 MP resolution for still photography. It was superseded by the Sony α7R IV in July 2019.

The camera does not include an optical low-pass (anti-aliasing) filter.

== Improvements over α7R II ==
Several improvements were made compared to the α7R II, including the following:

- Improved dynamic range due to lower noise in sensor readout
- 425 contrast-detect autofocus points, up from 25 in the α7R II
- Altered button layout reminiscent of the α9
- Improved autofocus performance by 2x.
- Improved battery life due to larger battery
- Dual SD card slots, compared to a single slot in the α7R II. However, the slots do not exactly match. One is an SD slot (UHS-I/II compliant), the other is a dual SD (UHS-I compliant) and Sony Memory Stick Duo slot.
- Improved shutter mechanism to reduce shutter-induced shake
- Pixel shift multi-shot mode that combines exposures taken on each subpixel of the Bayer filter, improving overall image quality

== See also ==
- Comparison of Sony α7 cameras
- Sony α9
- Exmor R

Family	Level	Format	'10	2011		2012	2013	2014	2015	2016	2017	2018	2019	2020	2021	2022	2023	2024	2025	2026
Alpha (α)	Indust	FF																ILX-LR1 ^{●}		
Alpha (α)	Cine line	FF													_{m} FX6 ^{●}					
Alpha (α)	Cine line	FF													_{m} FX3 ^{AT●}					
Alpha (α)	Cine line	FF																		_{m} FX2 ^{AT●}
Alpha (α)	Flag	FF													_{m} α1 ^{FT●}				_{m} α1 II ^{FAT●}	
Alpha (α)	Speed	FF										_{m} α9 ^{FT●}			_{m} α9 II ^{FT●}				_{m} α9 III ^{FAT●}	
Alpha (α)	Sens	FF							_{m} α7S ^{●}	_{m} α7S II ^{F●}					_{m} α7S III ^{AT●}					
Alpha (α)	Hi-Res	FF						_{m} α7R ^{●}		_{m} α7R II ^{F●}		_{m} α7R III ^{FT●}		_{m} α7R IV ^{FT●}			_{m} α7R V ^{FAT●}			
Alpha (α)	Basic	FF						_{m} α7 ^{F●}	_{m} α7 II ^{F●}				_{m} α7 III ^{FT●}			_{m} α7 IV ^{AT●}				_{m} α7 V ^{FAT●}
Alpha (α)	Compact	FF																_{m} α7CR ^{AT●}		
Alpha (α)	Compact	FF													_{m} α7C ^{AT●}			_{m} α7C II ^{AT●}		
Alpha (α)	Vlog	FF																_{m} ZV-E1 ^{AT●}		
Alpha (α)	Cine	APS-C															_{m} FX30 ^{AT●}			
Alpha (α)	Adv	APS-C			_{s} NEX-7 ^{F●}						_{m} α6500 ^{FT●}			_{m} α6600 ^{FT●}				_{m} α6700 ^{AT●}		
Alpha (α)	Mid-range	APS-C				_{m} NEX-6 ^{F●}					_{m} α6300 ^{F●}		_{m} α6400 ^{F+T●}							
Alpha (α)	Mid-range	APS-C						_{m} α6000 ^{F●}						_{m} α6100 ^{FT●}						
Alpha (α)	Vlog	APS-C														_{m} ZV-E10 ^{AT●}			_{m} ZV-E10 II ^{AT●}	
Alpha (α)	Entry-level	APS-C	NEX-5 ^{F●}	NEX-5N ^{FT●}		NEX-5R ^{F+T●}	NEX-5T ^{F+T●}		α5100 ^{F+T●}											
Alpha (α)	Entry-level	APS-C	NEX-3 ^{F●}	NEX-C3 ^{F●}		NEX-F3 ^{F+●}	NEX-3N ^{F+●}	α5000 ^{F+●}												
DSLR-style		APS-C					_{m} α3000 ^{●}		_{m} α3500 ^{●}											
SmartShot		APS-C							QX1 ^{M●}											
CineAlta	Cine line	FF										VENICE				VENICE 2				
CineAlta	Cine line	FF																BURANO		
XDCAM	Cine line	FF												_{m} FX9						
XDCAM	Docu	S35							_{m} FS7		_{m} FS7 II									
XDCAM	Mobile	S35								_{m} FS5			_{m} FS5 II							
NXCAM	Pro	S35		NEX-FS100		NEX-FS700	NEX-FS700R													
NXCAM	APS-C					NEX-EA50														
Handycam	FF					_{m} NEX-VG900														
Handycam	APS-C		_{s} NEX-VG10		_{s} NEX-VG20	_{m} NEX-VG30														
Security		FF									SNC-VB770									
Security		FF									UMC-S3C									
Family	Level	Format																		
Family	Level	Format	'10	2011		2012	2013	2014	2015	2016	2017	2018	2019	2020	2021	2022	2023	2024	2025	2026
