= Sony α7 II =

2014 full-frame mirrorless camera

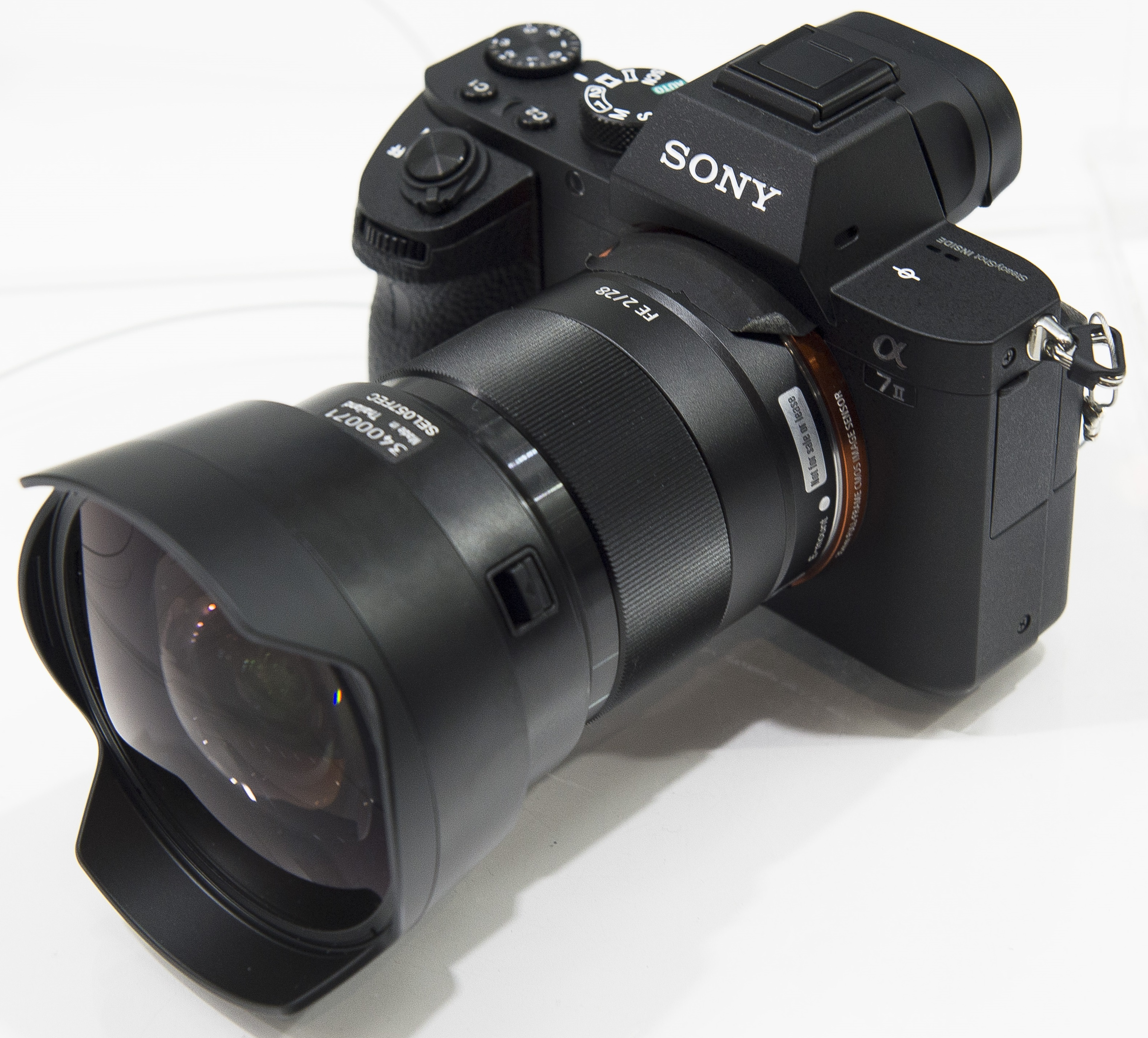

Overview
- Maker: Sony Group
- Type: Full-frame mirrorless interchangeable-lens camera
- Intro price: $1699.00

Lens
- Lens: Sony E-mount

Sensor/medium
- Sensor: 35.8 × 23.9 mm Exmor full-frame HD CMOS Sensor
- Maximum resolution: 6000 × 4000 (3:2) (24 megapixels)
- Film speed: Auto, 100-51200
- Storage media: Memory Stick Pro Duo, Pro-HG Duo, SD, SDHC, SDXC

Focusing
- Focus modes: Contrast Detect (sensor), Phase Detect, Multi-area, Center, Selective single-point, Single, Continuous, Face Detection, Live View, SteadyShot

Exposure/metering
- Exposure metering: Multi-segment, Center-weighted, Spot

Shutter
- Shutter: Electronically-controlled, vertical-traverse, focal-plane shutter
- Shutter speed range: 1/8000 - 30 sec, BULB
- Continuous shooting: 5 frame/s

Viewfinder
- Viewfinder: Built-in 2.4 million dots OLED Electronic viewfinder

General
- LCD screen: 3.0 in (76 mm) Tilting XtraFine LCD, 1,230,000 pixels
- Battery: NP-FW50, InfoLITHIUM, 7.2 V, 1080 mAh, 7.7 Wh, Lithium-Ion rechargeable battery
- Dimensions: 127 × 96 × 60 mm
- Weight: Approx. 599 g (21.1 oz) (camera body, card and battery)
- Made in: Thailand

Chronology
- Predecessor: Sony α7
- Successor: Sony α7 III

The Sony α7 II (model ILCE-7M2) is a full-frame mirrorless interchangeable-lens camera manufactured by Sony. It was announced on 20 November 2014 as the sequel to the original Sony α7 (model ILCE-7) and adds a 5-axis sensor-shift image stabilization (generically referred to as IBIS) to its 24MP full-frame CMOS sensor. The α7 II furthers Sony's Hybrid AF system, it has 30% faster and 1.5X better tracking compared to its predecessor. From a design standpoint, additional improvements include a more rugged build quality, a new front dial, and a relocated shutter release button. It was succeeded by the Sony α7 III, announced on 26 February 2018.

While the cameras can use any E-mount lens, the image circle of APSC E-mount glass will not cover full frame. Sony has a setting to auto crop in camera or you can crop afterward to taste. Sony now has a robust lineup of first party lenses and 3rd party lenses form the likes of Chinese lens manufacturers.

The α7 II uses the Sony Bionz X processor which is based on a quad-core ARM Cortex-A5 architecture, and is used to run Android apps on top of the Linux kernel. Detail reproduction and diffraction-reducing algorythms, area-specific noise reduction and 16-bit image processing + 14-bit raw output were all innovations introduced with this processor. It can process up to 20 frames per second and features Lock-on AF and object tracking.Other features include a 3-inch, tilting LCD, XGA OLED electronic viewfinder, Multi-interface (hot) shoe, Wi-Fi with NFC, and video recording with the XAVC S codec which offers a 50Mbit/s bit rate at 1080/60p (as well as 1080/30p and 1080/24p). and a 'LOG' picture profile.

== Model differences ==
| Model | α7 | α7R | α7S | α7 II | α7R II | α7S II |
|---|---|---|---|---|---|---|
| Product standing | Balanced | High Resolution | High Sensitivity | Balanced Mark II | High Resolution Mark II | High Sensitivity Mark II |
| Sensor resolution | 24.3 Mpx Exmor CMOS; 6,000×4,000 pixels (35.80 mm×23.90 mm) | 36.4 Mpx Exmor CMOS; 7,360×4,912 pixels (35.90 mm×24.00 mm) | 12.2 Mpx Exmor CMOS; 4,240×2,832 pixels (35.80 mm×23.90 mm) | 24.3 Mpx Exmor CMOS; 6,000×4,000 pixels (35.80 mm×23.90 mm) | 42.4 Mpx Exmor R BSI-CMOS; 7,952×5,304 pixels (35.90 mm×24.00 mm) | 12.2 Mpx Exmor CMOS; 4,240×2,832 pixels (35.80 mm×23.90 mm) |
| ISO range | Expanded ISO 50 - 25600; Multi frame NR 100 - 51200 | Expanded ISO 50 - 25600; Multi frame NR 100 - 51200 | Native ISO 100 - 102400; Expanded ISO 50 - 409600 | Expanded ISO 50 - 25600; Multi frame NR 100 - 51200 | Native ISO 100 - 25600; Expanded ISO 50 - 102400 | Native ISO 100 - 102400; Expanded ISO 50 - 409600 |
| Autofocus | 25 point contrast-detection w/ 117 points phase-detection | 25 point contrast-detection | 25 point contrast-detection | 25 point contrast-detection w/ 117 points phase-detection | 25 point contrast-detection w/ 399 points phase-detection | 169 point contrast-detection |
| Maximum flash sync speed | 1/250 | 1/160 | 1/250 | 1/250 | 1/250 | 1/250 |
| Max Continuous Shooting | 5 frame/s | 4 frame/s | 5 frame/s | 5 frame/s | 5 frame/s | 5 frame/s |
| In-body image stabilization | No | | | 5-axis | | |
| Flash Exposure Lock | No | No | Yes | Yes | Yes | |
| Electronic shutter mode | First-curtain only | No | First-curtain and Silent shutter | First-curtain only | First-curtain and Silent shutter | First-curtain and Silent shutter |
| Gapless on-chip lens | No | Yes | Yes | No | Yes | Yes |
| Live-view Tethered Capture | No | No | Yes | Yes | Yes | Yes |
| Custom minimum shutter speed at Auto ISO | No | No | No | No | Yes | Yes |
| Flexible Spot with Lock on AF | No | No | No | No | Yes | Yes |
| Continuous Eye-AF | No | No | No | No | Yes | Yes |
| AF Sensitivity | 0 ~ 20 EV | 0 ~ 20 EV | -4 ~ 20 EV | -1 ~ 20 EV | -2 ~ 20 EV | -4 ~ 20 EV |
| Metering Sensitivity | 0 ~ 20 EV | 0 ~ 20 EV | -3 ~ 20 EV | -1 ~ 20 EV | -3 ~ 20 EV | -3 ~ 20 EV |
| User Custom Buttons | 3 | 3 | 3 | 4 | 4 | 4 |
| Monitor Resolution | 921.6 K | | | 1,228.8 K | | |
| Viewfinder Magnification | 0.71× | | | | 0.78× | |
| Video record format | MPEG-4, AVCHD (28 Mbit/s); 1080p | | MPEG-4, AVCHD (28 Mbit/s), XAVC S (50 Mbit/s) 1080p | | MPEG-4, AVCHD (28 Mbit/s), XAVC S (100 Mbit/s) 4K video | |
| Video sampling | Line skipping | Line skipping | Full-pixel readout | Line skipping | Pixel-binning at Full Format; Full-pixel readout at Super 35 | Full-pixel readout |
| Slow motion video record | No | No | Yes (720p, 120fps) | No | Yes (720p, 120fps) | Yes (1080p, 120fps) |
| HDMI Output | 4K still and 1080p video | 4K still and 1080p video | 4K still and 4K video | 4K still and 1080p video | 8K still and 4K video | 4K still and 4K video |
| Video Light mode | No | No | Yes | No | Yes | |
| Professional Video edit | No | No | Picture Profile w/CineGamma, Timecode, Userbit | | | |
| Body material | Combi. of magnesium alloy and polycarbonate | Full magnesium alloy chassis and polycarb bayonet mount. | Full magnesium alloy chassis and stainless steel bayonet mount. | | | |
| Other features | Hybrid autofocus system | No optical Low-pass filter | Full-pixel readout video at Full Format | Hybrid autofocus system | Hybrid autofocus system, No optical Low-pass filter | Full-pixel readout video at Full Format |
| Phase-detection AF on non-native lenses | Only A-mount lenses with LA-EA2 and LA-EA4 | | | Yes (Firmware update) | Yes | Only with LA-EA2/4 |
| Operate while USB charging | No | No | No | No | Yes | Yes |
| Battery-life (CIPA standards) | 340 shots | 340 shots | 380 shots | 350 shots | 340 shots | 370 shots |
| Weight | 416 g | 407 g | 446 g | 556 g | 582 g | 584 g |
| Dimension | 127×94×48 mm | | | 127×96×60 mm | | 126.9x95.7x60.3 mm |
| Announced | 16 October 2013 | | 6 April 2014 | 20 November 2014 | 10 June 2015 | 11 September 2015 |

== See also ==
- Comparison of Sony α7 cameras
- List of Sony E-mount cameras
- List of Sony E-mount lenses
- Sony α6500
- Sony α7 III
- Sony α9

| Family | Level | Format | '10 | 2011 | | 2012 | 2013 | 2014 | 2015 | 2016 | 2017 | 2018 | 2019 | 2020 | 2021 | 2022 | 2023 | 2024 | 2025 | 2026 |
|---|---|---|---|---|---|---|---|---|---|---|---|---|---|---|---|---|---|---|---|---|
| Alpha (α) | Indust | FF | | | | | | | | | | | | | | | | ILX-LR1 ^{●} | | |
| Alpha (α) | Cine line | FF | | | | | | | | | | | | | _{m} FX6 ^{●} | | | | | |
| Alpha (α) | Cine line | FF | | | | | | | | | | | | | | | | | | _{m} FX5 ^{AT●} |
| Alpha (α) | Cine line | FF | | | | | | | | | | | | | _{m} FX3 ^{AT●} | | | | | |
| Alpha (α) | Cine line | FF | | | | | | | | | | | | | | | | | | _{m} FX2 ^{AT●} |
| Alpha (α) | Flag | FF | | | | | | | | | | | | | _{m} α1 ^{FT●} | | | | _{m} α1 II ^{FAT●} | |
| Alpha (α) | Speed | FF | | | | | | | | | | _{m} α9 ^{FT●} | | | _{m} α9 II ^{FT●} | | | | _{m} α9 III ^{FAT●} | |
| Alpha (α) | Sens | FF | | | | | | | _{m} α7S ^{●} | _{m} α7S II ^{F●} | | | | | _{m} α7S III ^{AT●} | | | | | |
| Alpha (α) | Hi-Res | FF | | | | | | _{m} α7R ^{●} | | _{m} α7R II ^{F●} | | _{m} α7R III ^{FT●} | | _{m} α7R IV ^{FT●} | | | _{m} α7R V ^{FAT●} | | | _{m} α7R VI ^{FAT●} |
| Alpha (α) | Basic | FF | | | | | | _{m} α7 ^{F●} | _{m} α7 II ^{F●} | | | | _{m} α7 III ^{FT●} | | | _{m} α7 IV ^{AT●} | | | | _{m} α7 V ^{FAT●} |
| Alpha (α) | Compact | FF | | | | | | | | | | | | | | | | _{m} α7CR ^{AT●} | | |
| Alpha (α) | Compact | FF | | | | | | | | | | | | | _{m} α7C ^{AT●} | | | _{m} α7C II ^{AT●} | | |
| Alpha (α) | Vlog | FF | | | | | | | | | | | | | | | | _{m} ZV-E1 ^{AT●} | | |
| Alpha (α) | Cine | APS-C | | | | | | | | | | | | | | | _{m} FX30 ^{AT●} | | | |
| Alpha (α) | Adv | APS-C | | | _{s} NEX-7 ^{F●} | | | | | | _{m} α6500 ^{FT●} | | | _{m} α6600 ^{FT●} | | | | _{m} α6700 ^{AT●} | | |
| Alpha (α) | Mid-range | APS-C | | | | _{m} NEX-6 ^{F●} | | | | | _{m} α6300 ^{F●} | | _{m} α6400 ^{F+T●} | | | | | | | |
| Alpha (α) | Mid-range | APS-C | | | | | | _{m} α6000 ^{F●} | | | | | | _{m} α6100 ^{FT●} | | | | | | |
| Alpha (α) | Vlog | APS-C | | | | | | | | | | | | | | _{m} ZV-E10 ^{AT●} | | | _{m} ZV-E10 II ^{AT●} | |
| Alpha (α) | Entry-level | APS-C | NEX-5 ^{F●} | NEX-5N ^{FT●} | | NEX-5R ^{F+T●} | NEX-5T ^{F+T●} | | α5100 ^{F+T●} | | | | | | | | | | | |
| Alpha (α) | Entry-level | APS-C | NEX-3 ^{F●} | NEX-C3 ^{F●} | | NEX-F3 ^{F+●} | NEX-3N ^{F+●} | α5000 ^{F+●} | | | | | | | | | | | | |
| DSLR-style | | APS-C | | | | | _{m} α3000 ^{●} | | _{m} α3500 ^{●} | | | | | | | | | | | |
| SmartShot | | APS-C | | | | | | | QX1 ^{M●} | | | | | | | | | | | |
| CineAlta | Cine line | FF | | | | | | | | | | VENICE | | | | VENICE 2 | | | | |
| CineAlta | Cine line | FF | | | | | | | | | | | | | | | | BURANO | | |
| XDCAM | Cine line | FF | | | | | | | | | | | | _{m} FX9 | | | | | | |
| XDCAM | Docu | S35 | | | | | | | _{m} FS7 | | _{m} FS7 II | | | | | | | | | |
| XDCAM | Mobile | S35 | | | | | | | | _{m} FS5 | | | _{m} FS5 II | | | | | | | |
| NXCAM | Pro | S35 | | NEX-FS100 | | NEX-FS700 | NEX-FS700R | | | | | | | | | | | | | |
| NXCAM | APS-C | | | | | NEX-EA50 | | | | | | | | | | | | | | |
| Handycam | FF | | | | | _{m} NEX-VG900 | | | | | | | | | | | | | | |
| Handycam | APS-C | | _{s} NEX-VG10 | | _{s} NEX-VG20 | _{m} NEX-VG30 | | | | | | | | | | | | | | |
| Security | | FF | | | | | | | | | SNC-VB770 | | | | | | | | | |
| Security | | FF | | | | | | | | | UMC-S3C | | | | | | | | | |
| Family | Level | Format | | | | | | | | | | | | | | | | | | |
| Family | Level | Format | '10 | 2011 | | 2012 | 2013 | 2014 | 2015 | 2016 | 2017 | 2018 | 2019 | 2020 | 2021 | 2022 | 2023 | 2024 | 2025 | 2026 |
