= Imatest =

Imatest LLC is a company that produces image quality testing software, equipment and test charts. Imatest was founded by photographer/engineer Norman Koren in Boulder, Colorado in 2004 to develop software for testing digital camera image quality.

Using Imatest software, a variety of image quality factors can be analyzed including Acutance (image sharpness), color response, image noise, dynamic range, tonal response, lens flare, lens distortion, lens vignetting, texture response, and color moiré.

Imatest software products include Imatest Master: for R&D engineers, Imatest IT: for test automation, and Imatest Studio: for photographers.

Imatest test charts include SFRplus, eSFR ISO, SFRreg, Spilled Coins, and 36-patch Dynamic Range targets.

Imatest has been adopted by a wide range of industries that employ embedded digital imaging systems, including mobile imaging (camera phones), automotive, medical imaging, aerospace and machine vision, as well as publications/reviews, and academic, cultural, and research institutions. Imatest software is referenced in research, art, and industry.

Imatest is a member of the International Organization for Standardization and Institute of Electrical and Electronics Engineers contributing and implementing standardized methods of image quality analysis.

Among many other applications, Imatest has been used to adjust images with different amounts of sharpening to a standard amount of sharpening, and to compare resolution in of those adjusted images. Imatest also tests color accuracy, tone-scale linearity, image distortion, light falloff, and printing gamut.
