= Back-illuminated sensor =

Type of digital image sensor

Comparison of simplified back-illuminated and front-illuminated pixel cross-sections

A back-illuminated (BI) sensor, also known as back-side illumination (BSI) sensor, is a type of digital image sensor that uses a novel arrangement of the imaging elements to increase the amount of light captured and thereby improve low-light performance.

The technique was used for some time in specialized roles like low-light security cameras and astronomy sensors, but was complex to build and required further refinement to become widely used. Sony was the first to reduce these problems and their costs sufficiently to introduce a 5-megapixel 1.75 μm BI CMOS sensor at general consumer prices in 2009. BI sensors from OmniVision Technologies have since been used in consumer electronics from other manufacturers as in the HTC EVO 4G Android smartphone, and as a major selling point for the camera in Apple's iPhone 4.

== Description ==
A traditional, retronymically called front-illuminated digital camera is constructed in a fashion similar to the human eye, with a lens at the front and photodetectors at the back. This traditional orientation of the sensor places the active matrix of the digital camera image sensor—a matrix of individual picture elements—on its front surface and simplifies manufacturing. The matrix and its wiring, however, block some of the light, and thus the photocathode layer can only receive the remainder of the incoming light; the blockages reduce the signal that is available to be captured.

A back-illuminated sensor contains the same elements, but arranges the wiring behind the photocathode layer by flipping the silicon wafer during manufacturing and then thinning its reverse side so that light can strike the photocathode layer without passing through the wiring layer. This change can improve the chance of an input photon being captured from about 60% to over 90%, (i.e. a 1/2 stop faster) with the greatest difference realised when pixel size is small, as the light capture area gained in moving the wiring from the top (light incident) to bottom surface (paraphrasing the BSI design) is proportionately larger for a smaller pixel. BSI-CMOS sensors are most advantageous in partial sun and other low light conditions. Placing the wiring behind the light sensors is similar to the difference between a cephalopod eye and a vertebrate eye. Orienting the active matrix transistors behind the photocathode layer can lead to a host of problems, such as crosstalk, which causes image noise, dark current, and color mixing between adjacent pixels. Thinning also makes the silicon wafer more fragile. These problems could be solved through improved manufacturing processes, but only at the cost of lower yields, and consequently higher prices. Despite these issues, early BI sensors found uses in niche roles where their better low-light performance was important. Early uses included industrial sensors, security cameras, microscope cameras and astronomy systems.

Other advantages of a BSI sensor include wider angular response (giving more flexibility for lens design) and possibly faster readout rates. Disadvantages include worse response uniformity.

== History ==
Industry observers noted (in 2008) that a back-illuminated sensor could theoretically cost less than a similar front-illuminated version. The ability to collect more light meant that a similarly sized sensor array could offer higher resolution without the drop in low-light performance otherwise associated with the megapixel (MP) race. Alternatively, the same resolution and low-light capability could be offered on a smaller chip, lowering costs. Key to attaining these advantages would be an improved process that addressed the yield problems, largely through improving the uniformity of an active layer on the front of the detectors.

A major step in the adoption of BI sensors was made when OmniVision Technologies sampled their first sensors using the technique in 2007. These sensors, however, did not see widespread use due to their high costs. The first widely used BI sensor was the OmniVision OV8810, which was announced on 23 September 2008, and contained 8 megapixels which were 1.4 μm in size. The OV8810 was used in the HTC Droid Incredible and HTC EVO 4G, which were released in April and June 2009, respectively. In June 2009, OmniVision announced the 5MP OV5650, which had the best low-light sensitivity at 1300 mV/lux-sec and the lowest stack height at 6 mm in the industry. Apple selected the OV5650 to use in the back camera of the iPhone 4, which garnered good reviews for its low-light photos.

Sony's work on new photodiode materials and processes allowed them to introduce their first consumer back-illuminated sensor as their CMOS-based "Exmor R" in August 2009. According to Sony, the new material offered +8 dB signaling and −2 dB noise. When combined with the new back-illuminated layout, the sensor improved low-light performance by as much as two times. The iPhone 4s employed an image sensor manufactured by Sony. In 2011, Sony implemented their Exmor R sensor in their flagship smartphone Sony Ericsson Xperia Arc.

In October 2012, GoPro used a Sony IMX117 sensor as the first BSI sensor in their action cameras, in the Hero3 Black.

In September 2014 Samsung announced the world's first APS-C sensor to adopt BSI pixel technology. This 28 MP sensor (S5KVB2) was adopted by their new compact system camera, the NX1, and was showcased along with the camera at Photokina 2014.

In June 2015 Sony announced the first camera employing a back-side illuminated full frame sensor, the α7R II.

In August 2017 Nikon announced that its forthcoming Nikon D850, a full-frame digital SLR camera, would have a back-illuminated sensor on its new 45.7 MP sensor.

In September 2018 Fujifilm announced the availability of the X-T3, a mirrorless interchangeable-lens camera, with a 26.1MP APS-C Fujifilm X-Trans sensor back-illuminated sensor.

In April 2021, Ricoh released the Pentax K-3 III featuring a BSI 26 megapixel APS-C sensor from Sony and a PRIME V image processor.

== Stacked CMOS ==
A further development is the stacked CMOS sensor, which layers the circuitry and image signal processor (ISP) behind the pixels, allowing the active pixel to occupy even more area, further increasing the chance of light capture. Sony, which announced the first stacked sensor in January 2012, claims a 30% increase in light captured. Stacked CMOS also allows more complex processing circuitry to be used simply by increasing the layer count, enabling faster frame rates and readout speeds.

In August 2012, Sony commercialized their stacked sensor technology as Exmor RS with resolutions of 13 and 8 effective megapixels.

In April 2021, Canon announced their new EOS R3 would feature a 35mm full-frame, back illuminated, stacked CMOS sensor and a DIGIC X image processor.

In May 2021, Sony announced a new back-illuminated, stacked sensor for the Micro Four Thirds format, IMX472-AAJK.

In December 2021, Nikon unveiled its first stacked sensor camera, the 45.7 MP Nikon Z9, which improves autofocus and continuous shooting performance.

In May 2022, Fujifilm commercialized its first stacked sensor, the X-Trans 5 HS, used in the Fujifilm X-H2S.

== Partially stacked CMOS ==
A partially stacked sensor is a BSI CMOS imaging sensor which integrates into the sensor stack some high-speed memory. This is not a full DRAM layer, which the stacked sensor design has. This results in significant improvement in speed versus a normal BSI design, but at a lower cost to manufacture than a full stacked sensor. Since some sensor layers, such as memory and processing, are stacked for speed, it gives less rolling shutter along with a faster readout speed.

The first camera to use a partially stacked sensor was the Nikon Z6III.

== See also ==
- Wafer backgrinding
