= Sony ZV-E10 II =

2024 APS-C mirrorless camera

Overview
- Maker: Sony Group
- Type: Mirrorless camera, interchangeable lens camera
- Released: July 10, 2024
- Intro price: $999 (body only) $1,099 (body + kit lens)

Lens
- Lens mount: Sony E-mount

Sensor/medium
- Sensor: APS-C 23.5 x 15.6 mm Exmor CMOS sensor
- Maximum resolution: 6192 × 4128 (26 megapixels)
- Film speed: ISO 100 – 32000 (50 – ISO 102400 expanded range)
- Recording medium: SDXC (UHS-II capable)

Focusing
- Focus areas: 759 focus points

Flash
- Flash: Sony α system flash compatible with Multi Interface Shoe

Shutter
- Shutter: Electronic, 1/8000 to 30s, bulb
- Continuous shooting: 11 frame/s in Hi+ mode (maximum speed)

Image processing
- Image processor: BIONZ XR
- White balance: Yes

General
- Video recording: XAVC S, XAVC HS up to 4K 60 fps or 120 fps with downloadable license, 1080p 120 fps, 10-bit and electronic image stabilization
- LCD screen: 2.95" 1,036,800 dots pixel TFT LCD, fully articulating, opening angle: ~176°, rotation angle: ~270°
- Battery: NP-FZ100 Li-ion
- AV port(s): HDMI micro connector (Type-D); 3.5 mm Stereo minijack
- Data port(s): USB 3.2 (Type-C), Wi-Fi, Bluetooth
- Dimensions: 114.8×67.5×54.2 mm (4.52×2.66×2.13 in)
- Weight: 292 g (10.3 oz) (body only), 377 g (13.3 oz) (incl. battery and memory card)

Chronology
- Predecessor: Sony ZV-E10

The Sony ZV-E10 II (ZV-E10 M2) is a APS-C mirrorless interchangeable lens camera (MILC) that was released on July 10, 2024 as the successor to the Sony ZV-E10. The purpose of this iteration was to encourage personalization from creators through additional granular control of the camera's Creative Looks presets and a newly added Cinematic Vlog setting. This camera shipped with the updated user-interface introduced with the Sony α7S III in 2021, while also utilizing the sensor, battery module, and processor from the Sony FX30 and Sony α6700 models.

== Specifications ==
Similar to its predecessor, the camera maintains its rotatable LCD screen, built-in microphone, detachable wind muff, and electronic image stabilization (EIS) technology. Additionally, this camera features a 26 MP sensor along with 10-bit recording capabilities and 5 GHz Wi-Fi connectivity. Sony also claimed the improved battery could "last up to 195 minutes per charge" during recording sessions. The camera also contains the BIONZ XR processor. It does not have in-body image stabilization (IBIS), a built-in flash, or mechanical shutter.

== Reception ==
PCMag gave the ZV-E10 M2 a 4 out of 5, regarding the camera's updated sensor and the switch to 10-bit color for 4K 60 fps recording. Fisher praises its in-body microphone quality and easy accessibility for new creators through features like Product Showcase alongside the auto focus' speed and accuracy parity with higher end cameras. He also highlights the mechanical shutter from the ZV-E10 M1 by noting that the eventual removal in the M2 led to subpar flash photography results, simultaneously with the lack of IBIS that persisted from the previous generation. Fisher ultimately would recommend the similarly priced Fujifilm X-S20 over the M2, since it has a stabilized sensor, mechanical shutter, and a built-in flash leaving the sacrifice of microphone quality negligible for a better image.

== See also ==
- List of Sony E-mount cameras

Family	Level	Format	'10	2011		2012	2013	2014	2015	2016	2017	2018	2019	2020	2021	2022	2023	2024	2025	2026
Alpha (α)	Indust	FF																ILX-LR1 ^{●}		
Alpha (α)	Cine line	FF													_{m} FX6 ^{●}					
Alpha (α)	Cine line	FF																		_{m} FX5 ^{AT●}
Alpha (α)	Cine line	FF													_{m} FX3 ^{AT●}					
Alpha (α)	Cine line	FF																		_{m} FX2 ^{AT●}
Alpha (α)	Flag	FF													_{m} α1 ^{FT●}				_{m} α1 II ^{FAT●}	
Alpha (α)	Speed	FF										_{m} α9 ^{FT●}			_{m} α9 II ^{FT●}				_{m} α9 III ^{FAT●}	
Alpha (α)	Sens	FF							_{m} α7S ^{●}	_{m} α7S II ^{F●}					_{m} α7S III ^{AT●}					
Alpha (α)	Hi-Res	FF						_{m} α7R ^{●}		_{m} α7R II ^{F●}		_{m} α7R III ^{FT●}		_{m} α7R IV ^{FT●}			_{m} α7R V ^{FAT●}			_{m} α7R VI ^{FAT●}
Alpha (α)	Basic	FF						_{m} α7 ^{F●}	_{m} α7 II ^{F●}				_{m} α7 III ^{FT●}			_{m} α7 IV ^{AT●}				_{m} α7 V ^{FAT●}
Alpha (α)	Compact	FF																_{m} α7CR ^{AT●}		
Alpha (α)	Compact	FF													_{m} α7C ^{AT●}			_{m} α7C II ^{AT●}		
Alpha (α)	Vlog	FF																_{m} ZV-E1 ^{AT●}		
Alpha (α)	Cine	APS-C															_{m} FX30 ^{AT●}			
Alpha (α)	Adv	APS-C			_{s} NEX-7 ^{F●}						_{m} α6500 ^{FT●}			_{m} α6600 ^{FT●}				_{m} α6700 ^{AT●}		
Alpha (α)	Mid-range	APS-C				_{m} NEX-6 ^{F●}					_{m} α6300 ^{F●}		_{m} α6400 ^{F+T●}							
Alpha (α)	Mid-range	APS-C						_{m} α6000 ^{F●}						_{m} α6100 ^{FT●}						
Alpha (α)	Vlog	APS-C														_{m} ZV-E10 ^{AT●}			_{m} ZV-E10 II ^{AT●}	
Alpha (α)	Entry-level	APS-C	NEX-5 ^{F●}	NEX-5N ^{FT●}		NEX-5R ^{F+T●}	NEX-5T ^{F+T●}		α5100 ^{F+T●}											
Alpha (α)	Entry-level	APS-C	NEX-3 ^{F●}	NEX-C3 ^{F●}		NEX-F3 ^{F+●}	NEX-3N ^{F+●}	α5000 ^{F+●}												
DSLR-style		APS-C					_{m} α3000 ^{●}		_{m} α3500 ^{●}											
SmartShot		APS-C							QX1 ^{M●}											
CineAlta	Cine line	FF										VENICE				VENICE 2				
CineAlta	Cine line	FF																BURANO		
XDCAM	Cine line	FF												_{m} FX9						
XDCAM	Docu	S35							_{m} FS7		_{m} FS7 II									
XDCAM	Mobile	S35								_{m} FS5			_{m} FS5 II							
NXCAM	Pro	S35		NEX-FS100		NEX-FS700	NEX-FS700R													
NXCAM	APS-C					NEX-EA50														
Handycam	FF					_{m} NEX-VG900														
Handycam	APS-C		_{s} NEX-VG10		_{s} NEX-VG20	_{m} NEX-VG30														
Security		FF									SNC-VB770									
Security		FF									UMC-S3C									
Family	Level	Format																		
Family	Level	Format	'10	2011		2012	2013	2014	2015	2016	2017	2018	2019	2020	2021	2022	2023	2024	2025	2026
