= Sony FX30 =

2022 APS-C mirrorless compact cinema camera

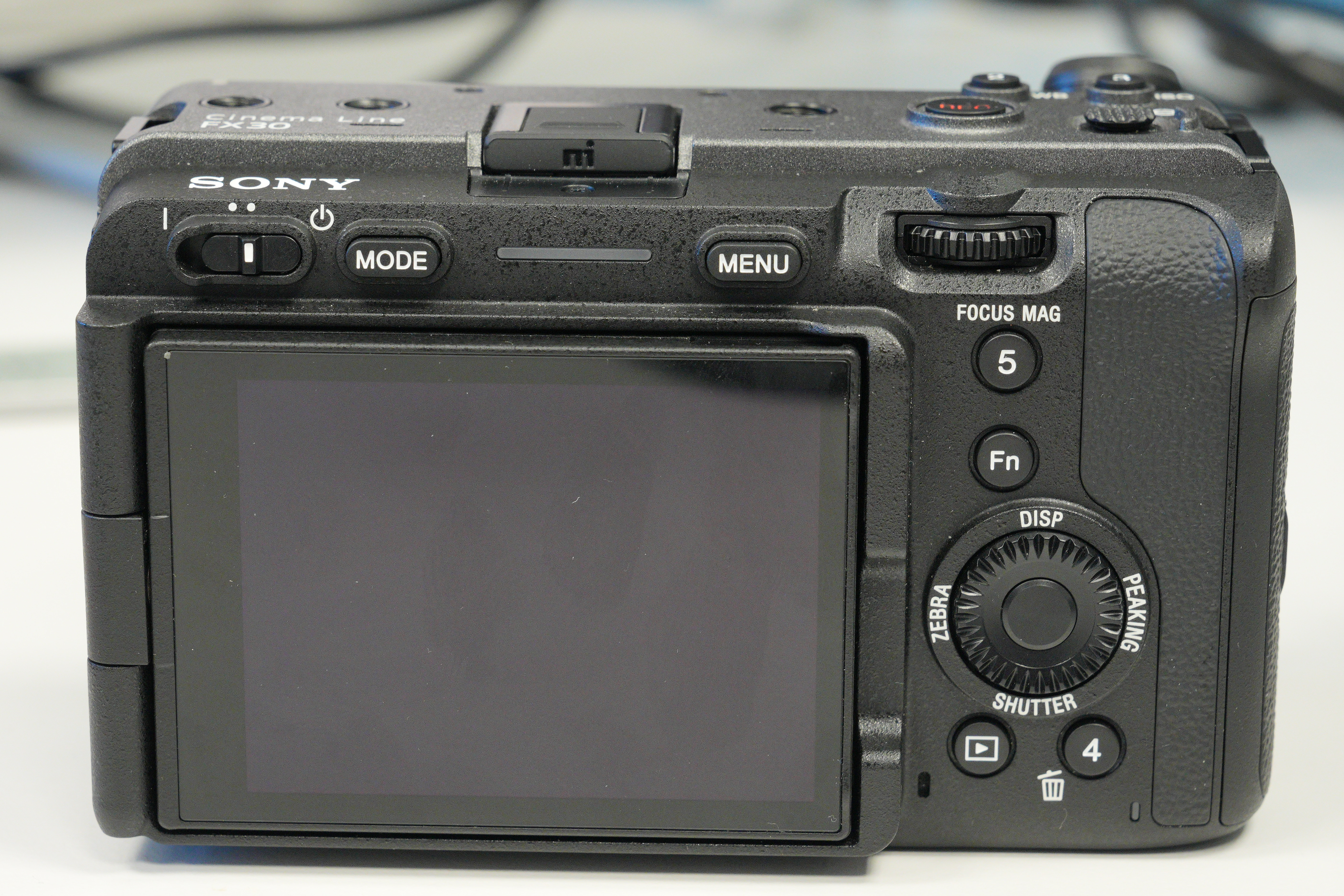

Overview
- Maker: Sony
- Type: APS-C MILC
- Released: September 29, 2022; 3 years ago
- Intro price: $1800 USD (body only)

Lens
- Lens mount: Sony E-mount
- Lens: Interchangeable lens

Sensor/medium
- Sensor: APS-C
- Sensor type: Exmor R CMOS Sensor
- Sensor size: 23.3mm x 15.5mm APS-C sized
- Sensor maker: Sony
- Maximum resolution: 26 megapixels (effective)
- Film speed: ISO 100–32000, ISO 50- 102400 Dual Base ISO: S-Log 3: Low Base ISO 800 / High Base ISO 2500
- Storage media: Dual Slot SD, SDHC, SDXC, CFexpress A UHS-II, UHS-I, CFexpress

Flash
- Flash: External flash
- Compatible flashes: Shoe Mount flash

Shutter
- Shutter: Electronically-controlled, vertical-traverse, focal-plane type
- Shutter speeds: 1/8000 to 30 seconds, bulb

Image processing
- Image processor: BIONZ XR

General
- Video recording: XAVC S, XAVC HS; 4K up to 120 fps, 1080p up to 120 fps, Raw 4.2k 16bit
- LCD screen: 3.0" Approx. 2.36M dots, touchscreen, variable-angle monitor
- Battery: NP-FZ100 Li-ion
- AV port(s): HDMI A, ⌀3.5 mm audio jack
- Data port: USB-C 3.2, Wi-Fi 5, Bluetooth 5.0
- Body features: Active Mode optical image stabilization, Image Sensor-Shift mechanism with 5-axis compensation, Anti-Dust System
- Dimensions: 129.7 mm × 77.8 mm × 84.5 mm (5.11 in × 3.06 in × 3.33 in)
- Weight: 646 g (23 oz) (1.424 lb) including battery, memory card and XLR handle
- Made in: Thailand

The Sony FX30 (ILME-FX30) is Sony's first semi-professional APS-C mirrorless interchangeable-lens cinema camera in their Cinema Line. It was announced on September 28, 2022, and released in the following month. The FX30 is based on the full-frame FX3 released in the previous year. The starting price of $1800 (USD) makes it the most affordable model in Sony's Cinema Line, and it offers a step-up in video potential for the APS-C lineup.

== Features ==
=== Features ===
- Back-illuminated Exmor R APS-C CMOS sensor
- S-Cinetone Picture Profile
- BIONZ XR processor
- H.265 10-bit 4:2:2 video codec
- Dual-Base ISO
- Dynamic range of 14+ stops
- 16-bit Raw video output
- High-speed rates of 120p in 4K and 120p in HD, 240p in S&Q
- Ability to preview user LUTs on LCD
- Real time Eye/Face AF
- Focus Assist & Focus Map features
- Active Mode Image Stabilization
- Tally Lamp while recording
- XLR audio inputs
- No EVF available

=== Limitations compared to FX3 ===
- Larger sensor resolution, smaller pixels and lower performance in low light situations
- UHD 120p recording is cropped 1.5X
- Smaller dynamic range (14+ vs 15+ steps)
- Different Base ISO (High Base ISO 2500 vs 12800)

=== Shared FX3/A7S III Attributes ===
- Compatible XLR handle (for professional audio)
- 5-axis in-body image stabilization
- 16-bit raw output via HDMI
- S-Log3 Picture Profile
- Vari-angle touch screen LCD
- New Sony Menu

=== Zoom lever button (like on other professional devices) ===
Usually this button would be the Turn ON/Turn OFF button. On the ILME-FX30 Sony it is a Zoom lever which helps zooming in and out while recording. In MENU there is an option to set its sensivity and speed.

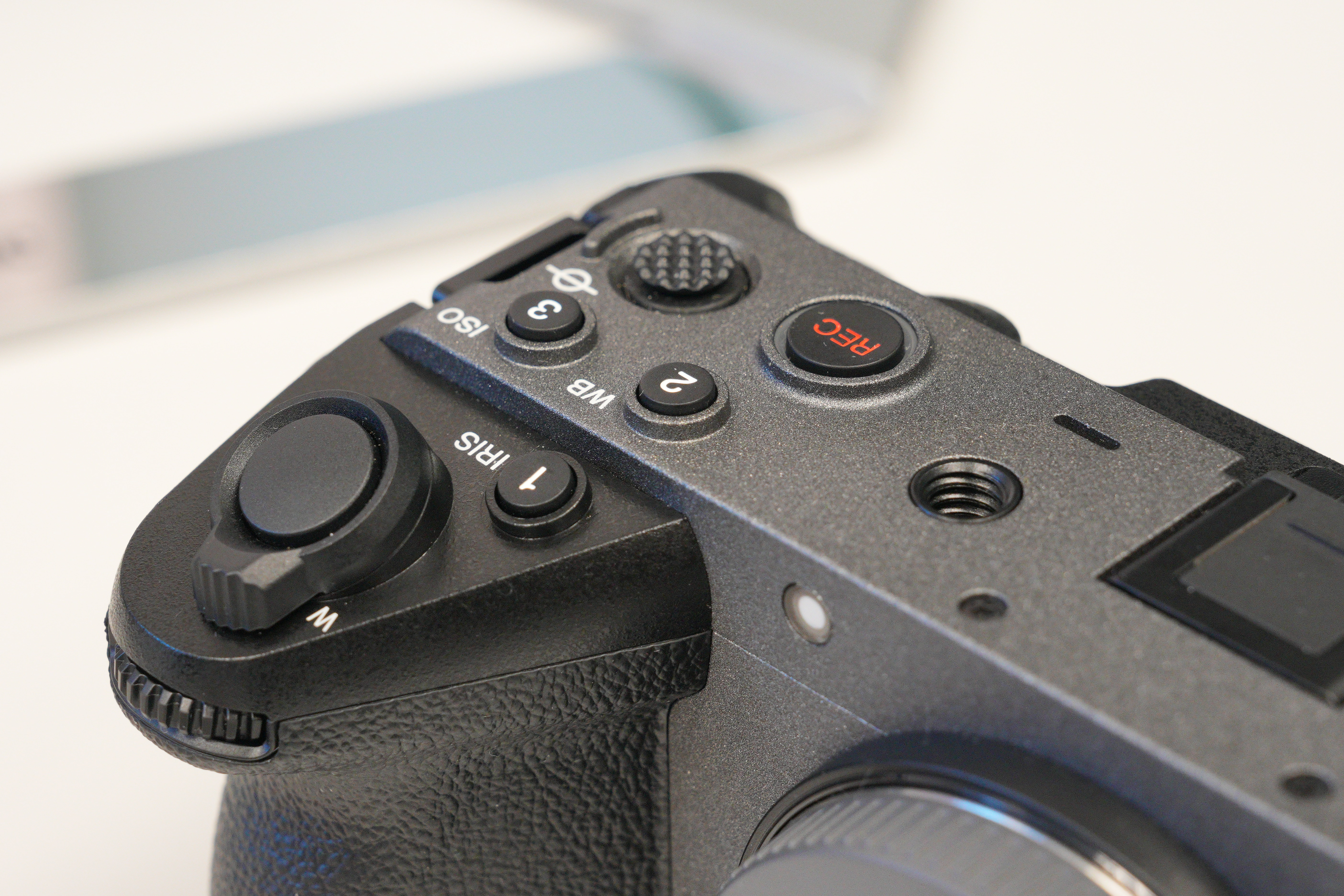
Zoom lever found attached to the shutter button

== See also ==
- List of Sony E-mount cameras
- Sony FX3
- Sony A7S III

Family	Level	Format	'10	2011		2012	2013	2014	2015	2016	2017	2018	2019	2020	2021	2022	2023	2024	2025	2026
Alpha (α)	Indust	FF																ILX-LR1 ^{●}		
Alpha (α)	Cine line	FF													_{m} FX6 ^{●}					
Alpha (α)	Cine line	FF													_{m} FX3 ^{AT●}					
Alpha (α)	Cine line	FF																		_{m} FX2 ^{AT●}
Alpha (α)	Flag	FF													_{m} α1 ^{FT●}				_{m} α1 II ^{FAT●}	
Alpha (α)	Speed	FF										_{m} α9 ^{FT●}			_{m} α9 II ^{FT●}				_{m} α9 III ^{FAT●}	
Alpha (α)	Sens	FF							_{m} α7S ^{●}	_{m} α7S II ^{F●}					_{m} α7S III ^{AT●}					
Alpha (α)	Hi-Res	FF						_{m} α7R ^{●}		_{m} α7R II ^{F●}		_{m} α7R III ^{FT●}		_{m} α7R IV ^{FT●}			_{m} α7R V ^{FAT●}			
Alpha (α)	Basic	FF						_{m} α7 ^{F●}	_{m} α7 II ^{F●}				_{m} α7 III ^{FT●}			_{m} α7 IV ^{AT●}				
Alpha (α)	Compact	FF																_{m} α7CR ^{AT●}		
Alpha (α)	Compact	FF													_{m} α7C ^{AT●}			_{m} α7C II ^{AT●}		
Alpha (α)	Vlog	FF																_{m} ZV-E1 ^{AT●}		
Alpha (α)	Cine	APS-C															_{m} FX30 ^{AT●}			
Alpha (α)	Adv	APS-C			_{s} NEX-7 ^{F●}						_{m} α6500 ^{FT●}			_{m} α6600 ^{FT●}				_{m} α6700 ^{AT●}		
Alpha (α)	Mid-range	APS-C				_{m} NEX-6 ^{F●}					_{m} α6300 ^{F●}		_{m} α6400 ^{F+T●}							
Alpha (α)	Mid-range	APS-C						_{m} α6000 ^{F●}						_{m} α6100 ^{FT●}						
Alpha (α)	Vlog	APS-C														_{m} ZV-E10 ^{AT●}			_{m} ZV-E10 II ^{AT●}	
Alpha (α)	Entry-level	APS-C	NEX-5 ^{F●}	NEX-5N ^{FT●}		NEX-5R ^{F+T●}	NEX-5T ^{F+T●}		α5100 ^{F+T●}											
Alpha (α)	Entry-level	APS-C	NEX-3 ^{F●}	NEX-C3 ^{F●}		NEX-F3 ^{F+●}	NEX-3N ^{F+●}	α5000 ^{F+●}												
DSLR-style		APS-C					_{m} α3000 ^{●}		_{m} α3500 ^{●}											
SmartShot		APS-C							QX1 ^{M●}											
CineAlta	Cine line	FF										VENICE				VENICE 2				
CineAlta	Cine line	FF																BURANO		
XDCAM	Cine line	FF												_{m} FX9						
XDCAM	Docu	S35							_{m} FS7		_{m} FS7 II									
XDCAM	Mobile	S35								_{m} FS5			_{m} FS5 II							
NXCAM	Pro	S35		NEX-FS100		NEX-FS700	NEX-FS700R													
NXCAM	APS-C					NEX-EA50														
Handycam	FF					_{m} NEX-VG900														
Handycam	APS-C		_{s} NEX-VG10		_{s} NEX-VG20	_{m} NEX-VG30														
Security		FF									SNC-VB770									
Security		FF									UMC-S3C									
Family	Level	Format																		
Family	Level	Format	'10	2011		2012	2013	2014	2015	2016	2017	2018	2019	2020	2021	2022	2023	2024	2025	2026
