= Sony FX6 =

2020 interchangeable-lens cinema camera

Overview
- Maker: Sony
- Type: Full Frame MILC
- Released: November 17, 2020; 5 years ago
- Intro price: MSRP: USD 5999 (body)

Lens
- Lens mount: Sony E-mount
- Lens: Interchangeable lens

Sensor/medium
- Sensor: Full frame
- Sensor type: Exmor R CMOS Sensor
- Sensor size: 35.6mm x 23.8mm Full Frame
- Sensor maker: Sony
- Maximum resolution: 12 megapixels 4240 × 2832
- Film speed: ISO 40-409600; Dual Base ISO Modes: S-Log 3; Low Base ISO 800; High Base ISO 12,800
- Storage media: Dual Slot SD; SDHC; SDXC; CFexpress A; UHS-II; UHS-I; CFexpress

Flash
- Flash: n/a
- Compatible flashes: Mi Shoe Mount (for digital microphones)

Shutter
- Shutter: Electronically-controlled, vertical-traverse, focal-plane type

Image processing
- Image processor: BIONZ XR

General
- Video recording: XAVC S, XAVC HS; 4K up to 120 fps, 1080p up to 120 fps, RAW output 4.2K 16bit
- LCD screen: 3.5" 1.44M dots (1280 x 720 pixels) touchscreen variable-angle monitor
- Battery: BP-U35 (from the original box); BP-U70; BP-U100; Li-ion
- AV port(s): HDMI A, ⌀3.5 mm audio jack
- Data port: USB-C 3.2, Wi-Fi 5, Bluetooth 5.0, NFC 3
- Body features: Active Mode optical image stabilization, Image Sensor-Shift mechanism with 5-axis compensation, Anti-Dust System
- Dimensions: 129.7 mm × 77.8 mm × 84.5 mm (5.11 in × 3.06 in × 3.33 in)
- Weight: 890 g (31 oz) (1.96 lb) excluding battery, memory card and XLR handle, grip, handle, monitor
- Made in: China

The Sony FX6 (ILME-FX6) is a full-frame mirrorless, interchangeable-lens, semi-professional cinema camera announced on 17 November 2020. The model is positioned between the smaller Sony ILME-FX3 and larger Sony PXW-FX9.

== Features ==
=== Inherited features from former models ===
The Sony FX6 is a successor of similar models such as NEX-FS700, PXW-FS5M2 – although earlier models focused on Super 35 shooting mode (APS-C sensor).

- Focused on one man operation, comfortable, handheld operation with multiple 1/4" mounting screw points, which allows users to use cages and accessories mounted on the camera
- Previous S35 (Super 35) sensor size had worse signal-to-noise ratio
- 19V power adapter for no time limit operation

=== Basic camera specifications of FX6 ===
- Full-frame sensor with 12.9 Mpx
- Cinema style shooting with DCI 4K option (17:9 aspect ratio)
- True 24p shooting for movie
- RAW 16bit output capability through 12G SDI and HDMI
- Dynamic range of 15+ stops
- Integrated Electronic Variable ND Filter
- Dual base ISO of 800 or a high-sensitivity 12,800 ISO for lower-light capture
- 409,600 maximum ISO for true low-light settings.
- Compatibility with BP-class battery type

=== Cinematic recording ===
The FX6 introduced S-Cinetone (from Sony VENICE), a video pre-set used by Sony's cinema cameras.

== Video resolutions and modes ==
PAL modes and NTSC modes has different Recording Frame Rates and Record Settings.

FF scanning mode Selectable movie modes in CINE EI (S-Gamut3.Cine/S-Log-3, S-Gamut3/S-Log-3)
Format	Frame size	Frame Rate	Color sampling / Color space	Maximum Bitrate
DCI 4K
XAVC Intra 4K	4096 x 2160 px	59.94p	4:2:2 10bit	600 Mbit
XAVC Intra 4K	4096 x 2160 px	50p	4:2:2 10bit	500 Mbit
XAVC Intra 4K	4096 x 2160 px	29.97p	4:2:2 10bit	300 Mbit
XAVC Intra 4K	4096 x 2160 px	25p	4:2:2 10bit	250 Mbit
XAVC Intra 4K	4096 x 2160 px	24p	4:2:2 10bit	240 Mbit
XAVC Intra 4K	4096 x 2160 px	23.976p	4:2:2 10bit	240 Mbit
4K (QFHD)
XAVC Intra 4K	3840 x 2160 px	59.94p	4:2:2 10bit	600 Mbit
XAVC Intra 4K	3840 x 2160 px	50p	4:2:2 10bit	500 Mbit
XAVC Intra 4K	3840 x 2160 px	29.97p	4:2:2 10bit	300 Mbit
XAVC Intra 4K	3840 x 2160 px	25p	4:2:2 10bit	250 Mbit
XAVC Intra 4K	3840 x 2160 px	23.976p	4:2:2 10bit	240 Mbit
4K (QFHD)
XAVC Long 4K	3840 x 2160 px	59.94p	4:2:0 8bit	156 Mbit
XAVC Long 4K	3840 x 2160 px	50p	4:2:0 8bit	156 Mbit
XAVC Long 4K	3840 x 2160 px	29.97p	4:2:0 8bit	100 Mbit
XAVC Long 4K	3840 x 2160 px	25p	4:2:0 8bit	100 Mbit
XAVC Long 4K	3840 x 2160 px	23.976p	4:2:0 8bit	100 Mbit
1080p (FHD)
XAVC Intra HD	1920 x 1080 px	59.94p	4:2:2 10bit	222 Mbit
XAVC Intra HD	1920 x 1080 px	50p	4:2:2 10bit	224 Mbit
XAVC Intra HD	1920 x 1080 px	29.97p	4:2:2 10bit	111 Mbit
XAVC Intra HD	1920 x 1080 px	25p	4:2:2 10bit	112 Mbit
XAVC Intra HD	1920 x 1080 px	23.976p	4:2:2 10bit	89 Mbit
1080p (FHD)
XAVC Long HD	1920 x 1080 px	59.94p	4:2:2 10bit	35 Mbit
XAVC Long HD	1920 x 1080 px	50p	4:2:2 10bit	35 Mbit
XAVC Long HD	1920 x 1080 px	29.97p	4:2:2 10bit	35 Mbit
XAVC Long HD	1920 x 1080 px	25p	4:2:2 10bit	35 Mbit
XAVC Long HD	1920 x 1080 px	23.976p	4:2:2 10bit	35 Mbit

== See also ==
- List of Sony E-mount cameras
- Sony FX3

Family	Level	Format	'10	2011		2012	2013	2014	2015	2016	2017	2018	2019	2020	2021	2022	2023	2024	2025	2026
Alpha (α)	Indust	FF																ILX-LR1 ^{●}		
Alpha (α)	Cine line	FF													_{m} FX6 ^{●}					
Alpha (α)	Cine line	FF																		_{m} FX5 ^{AT●}
Alpha (α)	Cine line	FF													_{m} FX3 ^{AT●}					
Alpha (α)	Cine line	FF																		_{m} FX2 ^{AT●}
Alpha (α)	Flag	FF													_{m} α1 ^{FT●}				_{m} α1 II ^{FAT●}	
Alpha (α)	Speed	FF										_{m} α9 ^{FT●}			_{m} α9 II ^{FT●}				_{m} α9 III ^{FAT●}	
Alpha (α)	Sens	FF							_{m} α7S ^{●}	_{m} α7S II ^{F●}					_{m} α7S III ^{AT●}					
Alpha (α)	Hi-Res	FF						_{m} α7R ^{●}		_{m} α7R II ^{F●}		_{m} α7R III ^{FT●}		_{m} α7R IV ^{FT●}			_{m} α7R V ^{FAT●}			_{m} α7R VI ^{FAT●}
Alpha (α)	Basic	FF						_{m} α7 ^{F●}	_{m} α7 II ^{F●}				_{m} α7 III ^{FT●}			_{m} α7 IV ^{AT●}				_{m} α7 V ^{FAT●}
Alpha (α)	Compact	FF																_{m} α7CR ^{AT●}		
Alpha (α)	Compact	FF													_{m} α7C ^{AT●}			_{m} α7C II ^{AT●}		
Alpha (α)	Vlog	FF																_{m} ZV-E1 ^{AT●}		
Alpha (α)	Cine	APS-C															_{m} FX30 ^{AT●}			
Alpha (α)	Adv	APS-C			_{s} NEX-7 ^{F●}						_{m} α6500 ^{FT●}			_{m} α6600 ^{FT●}				_{m} α6700 ^{AT●}		
Alpha (α)	Mid-range	APS-C				_{m} NEX-6 ^{F●}					_{m} α6300 ^{F●}		_{m} α6400 ^{F+T●}							
Alpha (α)	Mid-range	APS-C						_{m} α6000 ^{F●}						_{m} α6100 ^{FT●}						
Alpha (α)	Vlog	APS-C														_{m} ZV-E10 ^{AT●}			_{m} ZV-E10 II ^{AT●}	
Alpha (α)	Entry-level	APS-C	NEX-5 ^{F●}	NEX-5N ^{FT●}		NEX-5R ^{F+T●}	NEX-5T ^{F+T●}		α5100 ^{F+T●}											
Alpha (α)	Entry-level	APS-C	NEX-3 ^{F●}	NEX-C3 ^{F●}		NEX-F3 ^{F+●}	NEX-3N ^{F+●}	α5000 ^{F+●}												
DSLR-style		APS-C					_{m} α3000 ^{●}		_{m} α3500 ^{●}											
SmartShot		APS-C							QX1 ^{M●}											
CineAlta	Cine line	FF										VENICE				VENICE 2				
CineAlta	Cine line	FF																BURANO		
XDCAM	Cine line	FF												_{m} FX9						
XDCAM	Docu	S35							_{m} FS7		_{m} FS7 II									
XDCAM	Mobile	S35								_{m} FS5			_{m} FS5 II							
NXCAM	Pro	S35		NEX-FS100		NEX-FS700	NEX-FS700R													
NXCAM	APS-C					NEX-EA50														
Handycam	FF					_{m} NEX-VG900														
Handycam	APS-C		_{s} NEX-VG10		_{s} NEX-VG20	_{m} NEX-VG30														
Security		FF									SNC-VB770									
Security		FF									UMC-S3C									
Family	Level	Format																		
Family	Level	Format	'10	2011		2012	2013	2014	2015	2016	2017	2018	2019	2020	2021	2022	2023	2024	2025	2026
