= Sony ZV-E10 =

2021 APS-C mirrorless camera

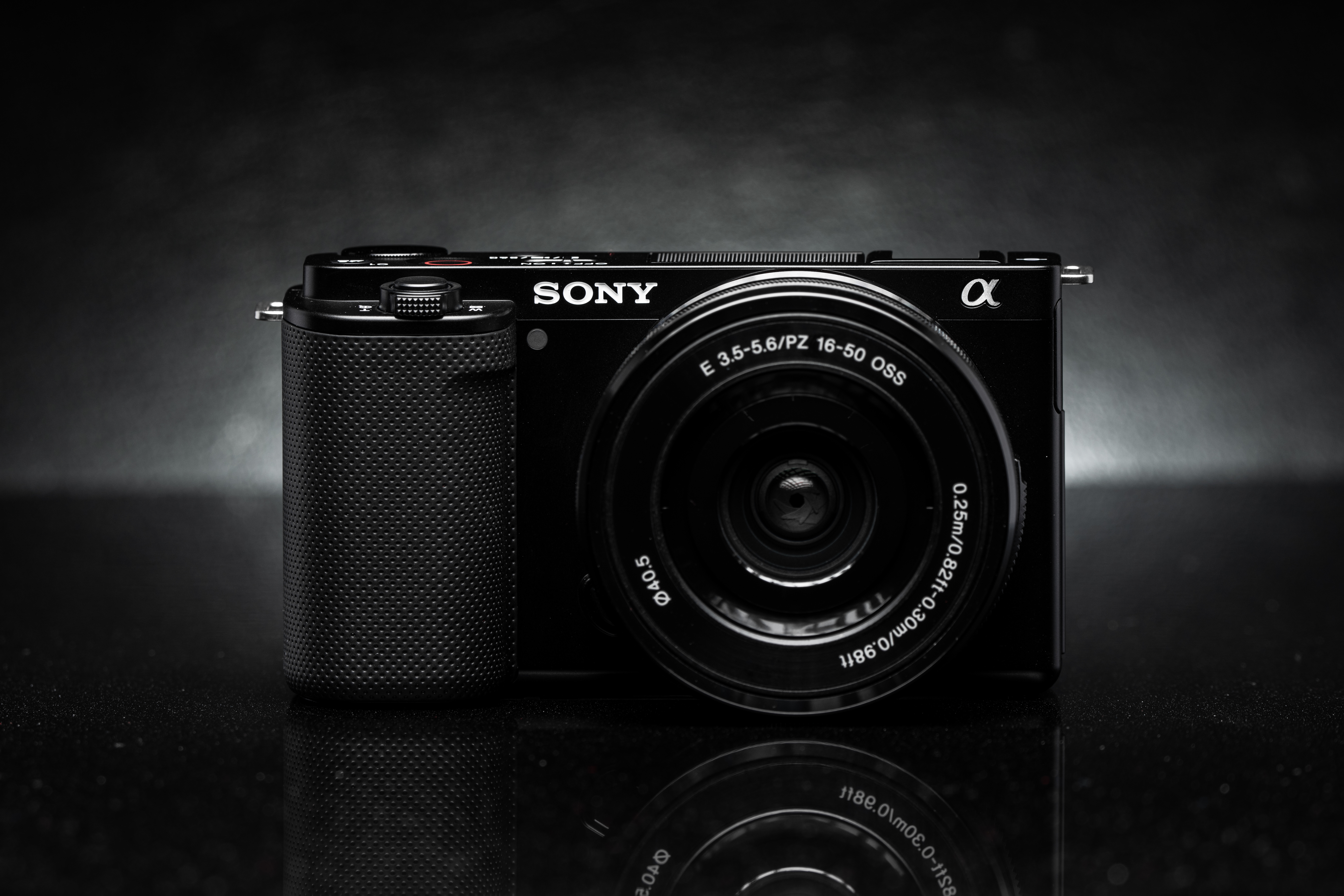

Overview
- Maker: Sony Group
- Type: Mirrorless camera, interchangeable lens camera
- Released: July 27, 2021

Lens
- Lens: Sony E-mount

Sensor/medium
- Sensor: APS-C 23.5 x 15.6 mm Exmor CMOS sensor
- Maximum resolution: 6000 x 4000 (24 megapixels)
- Film speed: ISO 100–32000 (50 to ISO 51200 expanded range)

Focusing
- Focus areas: 425 focus points

Exposure/metering
- Metering modes: Multi-segment, Center-weighted, Spot, Entire Screen Average, Highlight

Flash
- Flash: Sony α system flash compatible with Multi Interface Shoe

Shutter
- Shutter: 1/4000 to 30 s, bulb
- Continuous shooting: 8 frame/s, 11 frame/s in speed priority mode

Image processing
- Image processor: BIONZ X
- White balance: Yes

General
- Video recording: 3840 x 2160, 4:2:0, 8 bit, up to 100Mbps at 24/25/30 fps, electronic image stabilization
- LCD screen: 2.95" 921,600 pixel TFT LCD, fully articulating, opening angle: ~176°, rotation angle: ~270°
- Dimensions: 115.2×64.2×44.8 mm (4.54×2.53×1.76 in)
- Weight: 343 g (12 oz) including battery

Chronology
- Successor: Sony ZV-E10 II

The Sony ZV-E10 is a mirrorless camera that was released in 2021. It is based on the Sony α6100 and aimed at vloggers.

== Specifications ==
The specifications of the camera deviate from other popular APS-C cameras as its main focus is shooting video. It has no built-in flash. It lacks a viewfinder, instead relying on its built-in LCD screen to allow the user to frame a shot. The LCD can fully articulate so it can face the subject, enabling the use of the camera on a selfie stick. The camera has a relatively good microphone integrated and ships with a detachable windmuff. It has a feature called "Product Showcase" which shifts the focus to objects that are held in front of the camera where the focus would otherwise remain on any faces that are in frame.

=== Comparison to other Sony cameras ===
The lower cost Sony ZV-1 has a similar target demographic and design philosophy but has no interchangeable lens. The Sony α6100 (and various other models from the 6000 series) have a viewfinder and flash but no microphone windmuff, electronic image stabilization (EIS) or Product Showcase.

The Sony ZV-E1 is a fullframe 12MP video camera with a compact form factor targeting professional vloggers.

== Reception ==
Reviews for the ZV-E10 are mostly positive. Reviewers praised the image quality, articulating display, microphone, price, and autofocus. Common points of criticism are intense rolling shutter when recording 4K video, battery life, lack of a viewfinder, and inability to record 4K video at 60fps.

=== Sales ===
In Japan, according to reports from BCN Retail, the ZV-E10 was the best selling camera in 2023 and 2024. In 2022 it was the second best selling camera while in 2021, the ZV-E10's release year, it was the fifth.

According to sales data that was collected by the Chinese E-commerce platform JD.com, the ZV-E10 was the fourth best selling camera in China in 2025.

In 2021, Sony temporarily suspended manufacturing due to the global chip shortage of 2020-2023, causing a significant decrease in sales.

== See also ==
- List of Sony E-mount cameras

Family	Level	Format	'10	2011		2012	2013	2014	2015	2016	2017	2018	2019	2020	2021	2022	2023	2024	2025	2026
Alpha (α)	Indust	FF																ILX-LR1 ^{●}		
Alpha (α)	Cine line	FF													_{m} FX6 ^{●}					
Alpha (α)	Cine line	FF													_{m} FX3 ^{AT●}					
Alpha (α)	Cine line	FF																		_{m} FX2 ^{AT●}
Alpha (α)	Flag	FF													_{m} α1 ^{FT●}				_{m} α1 II ^{FAT●}	
Alpha (α)	Speed	FF										_{m} α9 ^{FT●}			_{m} α9 II ^{FT●}				_{m} α9 III ^{FAT●}	
Alpha (α)	Sens	FF							_{m} α7S ^{●}	_{m} α7S II ^{F●}					_{m} α7S III ^{AT●}					
Alpha (α)	Hi-Res	FF						_{m} α7R ^{●}		_{m} α7R II ^{F●}		_{m} α7R III ^{FT●}		_{m} α7R IV ^{FT●}			_{m} α7R V ^{FAT●}			
Alpha (α)	Basic	FF						_{m} α7 ^{F●}	_{m} α7 II ^{F●}				_{m} α7 III ^{FT●}			_{m} α7 IV ^{AT●}				_{m} α7 V ^{FAT●}
Alpha (α)	Compact	FF																_{m} α7CR ^{AT●}		
Alpha (α)	Compact	FF													_{m} α7C ^{AT●}			_{m} α7C II ^{AT●}		
Alpha (α)	Vlog	FF																_{m} ZV-E1 ^{AT●}		
Alpha (α)	Cine	APS-C															_{m} FX30 ^{AT●}			
Alpha (α)	Adv	APS-C			_{s} NEX-7 ^{F●}						_{m} α6500 ^{FT●}			_{m} α6600 ^{FT●}				_{m} α6700 ^{AT●}		
Alpha (α)	Mid-range	APS-C				_{m} NEX-6 ^{F●}					_{m} α6300 ^{F●}		_{m} α6400 ^{F+T●}							
Alpha (α)	Mid-range	APS-C						_{m} α6000 ^{F●}						_{m} α6100 ^{FT●}						
Alpha (α)	Vlog	APS-C														_{m} ZV-E10 ^{AT●}			_{m} ZV-E10 II ^{AT●}	
Alpha (α)	Entry-level	APS-C	NEX-5 ^{F●}	NEX-5N ^{FT●}		NEX-5R ^{F+T●}	NEX-5T ^{F+T●}		α5100 ^{F+T●}											
Alpha (α)	Entry-level	APS-C	NEX-3 ^{F●}	NEX-C3 ^{F●}		NEX-F3 ^{F+●}	NEX-3N ^{F+●}	α5000 ^{F+●}												
DSLR-style		APS-C					_{m} α3000 ^{●}		_{m} α3500 ^{●}											
SmartShot		APS-C							QX1 ^{M●}											
CineAlta	Cine line	FF										VENICE				VENICE 2				
CineAlta	Cine line	FF																BURANO		
XDCAM	Cine line	FF												_{m} FX9						
XDCAM	Docu	S35							_{m} FS7		_{m} FS7 II									
XDCAM	Mobile	S35								_{m} FS5			_{m} FS5 II							
NXCAM	Pro	S35		NEX-FS100		NEX-FS700	NEX-FS700R													
NXCAM	APS-C					NEX-EA50														
Handycam	FF					_{m} NEX-VG900														
Handycam	APS-C		_{s} NEX-VG10		_{s} NEX-VG20	_{m} NEX-VG30														
Security		FF									SNC-VB770									
Security		FF									UMC-S3C									
Family	Level	Format																		
Family	Level	Format	'10	2011		2012	2013	2014	2015	2016	2017	2018	2019	2020	2021	2022	2023	2024	2025	2026
