= List of Sony E-mount cameras =

Sony has released the following E-mount cameras since 2010. The E stands for the Eighteen mm flange distances of the E-mount cameras. Depending on type and model E-mount cameras are part of the Sony α, SmartShot, Handycam, NXCAM or XDCAM systems.

List of Sony E-mount cameras:

Name	Model	Release date	Code	ID	System	Type	Format (crop f.)	Sensor	Touch to focus	Touch menus	5 axis IBIS	Eye AF	Fastest mech. shutter speed	Max FPS Cont. Shooting Mech. shutter	Fastest elec. shutter speed	Max FPS Cont. Shooting Elec. shutter	Phase Detect AF points	Contrast AF points	Max ISO in Auto modes	Custom buttons on the body	Mem. buffer	Screen	Viewfinder	Flash	Battery	Weight	Full HD Video	4k Video	Video duration limit	S&Q Slow and Quick video	DxOMark Low Light ISO	Charging	Hotshoe	Latest firmware	User level	Announce date	Availability
Sony α7R VI	ILCE-7RM6	2026-08		410	α (Alpha)	MILC	Full frame, 35.8×23.9mm, (1.0×)	Fully-stacked Exmor RS-CMOS-Full Format Sensor				No	1/8000 s	10 FPS (mechanical)		30 FPS (electronic)										713 g									Semi-Professional		Current
Sony NEX-3	NEX-3 (with Eye-Fi), NEX-3C (without Eye-Fi)	2010-06	CX75210	279	α (Alpha)	MILC	APS-C, 23.4×15.6mm (1.5×)	CMOS, Exmor, 14.2 MP	No touch to focus	No touch menus	No IBIS	No	1/4000 s	7 fps without AF-C, 2.3 fps with AF-C	No Silent Electronic Shutter		0	25															Smart Accessory Terminal 1	5	Entry level	2010-02-21, 2010-05-11	Discontinued
Sony NEX-5	NEX-5 (with Eye-Fi), NEX-5C (without Eye-Fi)	2010-06	CX75110, CX75121, CX75141	278	α (Alpha)	MILC	APS-C, 23.4×15.6mm (1.5×)	CMOS, Exmor, 14.2 MP	No touch to focus	No touch menus	No IBIS	No	1/4000 s	7 fps without AF-C, 2.3 fps with AF-C	No Silent Electronic Shutter		0	25	1600 ISO	No custom buttons on the body		Tiltable 45° down and 90° up	Sony FDA-EV1S viewfinder accessory	Flash accessory	1080 mAh NP-FW50	287 g	1920 x 1080	No 4k video	30 min video duration limit	NO S&Q Slow and Quick video	796 DxOMark Low Light ISO	Battery can only be charged in external charger	Smart Accessory Terminal 1	5	Midrange	2010-02-21, 2010-05-11	Discontinued
Sony NEX-C3	NEX-C3	2011-08	CX75400, CX75420	284	α (Alpha)	MILC	APS-C (1.5×)	CMOS, Exmor HD, 16.2 MP	No touch to focus	No touch menus	No IBIS	No	1/4000 s	7 fps without AF-C, 2.3 fps with AF-C	No Silent Electronic Shutter		0	25															Smart Accessory Terminal 1	2	Entry level	2011-06-08	Discontinued
Sony NEX-5N	NEX-5N	2011-09	CX75500, CX75520	288	α (Alpha)	MILC	APS-C (1.5×)	CMOS, Exmor HD, 16.1 MP	Touch to focus	Yes, touch menus	No IBIS	No	1/4000 s	10 fps without AF-C, 3 fps with AF-C	No Silent Electronic Shutter		0	25	3200 ISO	No custom buttons on the body		Tiltable 45° down and 90° up	Sony FDA-EV1S viewfinder accessory	Flash accessory	1080 mAh NP-FW50	269 g	1920 x 1080	No 4k video	30 min video duration limit	NO S&Q Slow and Quick video	1079 DxOMark Low Light ISO	Battery can only be charged in external charger	Smart Accessory Terminal 2	1.02	Midrange	2011-08-24	Discontinued
Sony NEX-7	NEX-7, Hasselblad Lunar, Hasselblad Lunar Limited Edition	2011-12	CX75600, CX75620	289	α (Alpha)	MILC	APS-C, 23.5×15.6mm (1.5×)	CMOS, Exmor HD, 24.3 MP	No touch to focus	No touch menus	No IBIS	No	1/4000 s	10 fps without AF-C, 3 fps with AF-C	No Silent Electronic Shutter		0	25															Auto-lock Accessory Shoe (4-pin iISO)	1.03	Advanced Amateur	2011-08-24	Discontinued
Sony NEX-F3	NEX-F3	2012-06	CX75700	293	α (Alpha)	MILC	APS-C, 23.5×15.6mm (1.5×)	CMOS, Exmor HD, 16.1 MP	No touch to focus	No touch menus	No IBIS	No	1/4000 s	5.5 fps without AF-C, 2.5 fps with AF-C	No Silent Electronic Shutter		0	25															Smart Accessory Terminal 2	1.01	Entry level	2012-05-17	Discontinued
Sony NEX-5R	NEX-5R	2012-10	CX75820	296	α (Alpha)	MILC	APS-C (1.5×)	CMOS, Exmor HD, 16.1 MP	Touch to focus	Touch menus	No IBIS	No	1/4000 s	10 fps without AF-C, 3 fps with AF-C	No Silent Electronic Shutter		99	25															Smart Accessory Terminal 2	1.03	Midrange	2012-08-29	Discontinued
Sony NEX-6	NEX-6	2012-11	CX76060	295	α (Alpha)	MILC	APS-C, 23.5×15.6mm (1.5×)	CMOS, Exmor HD, 16.1 MP	No touch to focus	No touch menus	No IBIS	No	1/4000 s	10 fps without AF-C, 3 fps with AF-C	No Silent Electronic Shutter		99	25															Multi Interface Shoe	1.03	Advanced Amateur	2012-09-12	Discontinued
Sony NEX-3N	NEX-3N	2013-03	CX76200	305	α (Alpha)	MILC	APS-C, ca. 23.5×15.6mm (1.5×)	CMOS, Exmor HD, ca. 16 MP	No touch to focus	No touch menus	No IBIS	No	1/4000 s	4 fps without AF-C, 2.5 fps with AF-C	No Silent Electronic Shutter		0	25	3200 ISO	No custom buttons		Tiltable 90° up	None	In-body pop-up	1080 mAh NP-FW50	269 g	1920x 1080	No 4k	30 min video duration limit			Can be charged in body, or in external charger	N/A	1.00	Entry level	2013-02-20	Discontinued
Sony NEX-5T	NEX-5T	2013-09	CX76500	307	α (Alpha)	MILC	APS-C (1.5×)	CMOS, Exmor HD, 16.1 MP	Touch to focus	Touch menus	No IBIS	No	1/4000 s	10 fps without AF-C, 3 fps with AF-C	No Silent Electronic Shutter		99	25															Smart Accessory Terminal 2	1.01	Midrange	2013-08-24	Discontinued
Sony α3000	ILCE-3000	2013-08	CX77100, CX77121	302	α (Alpha)	MILC	APS-C, ca. 23.5×15.6mm (1.5×)	CMOS, Exmor HD, 20.1 MP	No touch to focus	No touch menus	No IBIS	No	1/4000 s	3.5 fps without AF-C, 2.5 fps with AF-C	No Silent Electronic Shutter		0	25															Multi Interface Shoe	1.00/1.01	Entry level	2013-08-27	Discontinued
Sony α7	ILCE-7	2013-11	CX77800	306	α (Alpha)	MILC	Full frame, 35.8×23.9mm, (1.0×)	CMOS, Exmor HD, 24.3 MP	No touch to focus	No touch menus	No IBIS	AF-S	1/8000 s	5 fps without live view, 2.5 fps with live view	No Silent Electronic Shutter		117	25															Multi Interface Shoe	3.20	Semi-Professional	2013-10-16	Discontinued
Sony α7R	ILCE-7R, Hasselblad Lusso	2013-11	CX77900	311	α (Alpha)	MILC	Full frame, 35.9×24.0mm, (1.0×)	CMOS, Exmor HD, 36.4 MP	No touch to focus	No touch menus	No IBIS	AF-S	1/8000 s	4 fps without AF-C, 1.5 fps with AF-C	No Silent Electronic Shutter		0	25															Multi Interface Shoe	3.20	Semi-Professional	2013-10-16	Discontinued
Sony α5000	ILCE-5000	2014-03	CX77300, CX77361	313	α (Alpha)	MILC	APS-C, ca. 23.2×15.4mm (1.5×)	CMOS, Exmor HD, 20.1 MP	No touch to focus	No touch menus	No IBIS	AF-S	1/4000 s	2.5 fps with live view	No Silent Electronic Shutter		0	25	3200 ISO	No custom buttons on the body		Tiltable 180° up	No viewfinder	In-body pop-up	1080 mAh NP-FW50	269 g	1920 x 1080	No 4k video	30 min video duration limit	NO S&Q Slow and Quick video	1089 DxOMark Low Light ISO	Battery can be charged with micro-USB cable or in external charger. Can't be charged while in use.	N/A	1.10	Entry level	2014-01-07	Discontinued
Sony α6000	ILCE-6000	2014-04	CX77500	312	α (Alpha)	MILC	APS-C, ca. 23.5×15.6mm (1.5×)	CMOS, Exmor HD, 24.3 MP	No touch to focus	No touch menus	No IBIS	AF-S	1/4000 s	11 fps without live view (HI), 2.5 fps with live view (LO)	No Silent Electronic Shutter		179	25	3200 ISO	C1, C2, AEL, Rotary dial		Tiltable 45° down and 90° up	1440 k dots viewfinder	In body pop-up tiltable flash	1020 mAh NP-FW50	344 g		No 4k video	30 min video duration limit	NO S&Q Slow and Quick video	1347 DxOMark Low Light ISO	Battery can be charged with micro-USB cable or in external charger. Can't be charged while in use.	Multi Interface Shoe	3.20	Advanced Amateur	2014-02-12	Discontinued
Sony α3500	ILCE-3500	2014-03	CX77100	302	α (Alpha)	MILC	APS-C, ca. 23.2×15.4mm (1.5×)	CMOS, Exmor HD, 20.1 MP	No touch to focus	No touch menus	No IBIS	No	1/4000 s	3.5 fps without AF-C, 2.5 fps with AF-C	No Silent Electronic Shutter		0	25															Multi Interface Shoe	1.01	Entry level	2014-03-21	Discontinued
Sony α7S	ILCE-7S	2014-06	CX78500	318	α (Alpha)	MILC	Full frame, 35.6×23.8mm, (1.0×)	CMOS, Exmor HD, 12.2 MP	No touch to focus	No touch menus	No IBIS	AF-S	1/8000 s	5 fps without AF-C or live view, 2.5 fps with AF-C and live view	1/8000 s	5 fps without AF-C or live view, 2.5 fps with AF-C and live view	0	25															Multi Interface Shoe	3.20	Semi-Professional	2014-04-06	Current
Sony α5100	ILCE-5100	2014-09	CX78300?	339	α (Alpha)	MILC	APS-C, approx. 23.5×15.6mm (1.5×)	CMOS, Exmor HD, 24.3 MP	Touch to focus	No touch menus	No IBIS	AF-S	1/4000 s	6 fps without live view (HI), 3 fps with live view (LO)	No Silent Electronic Shutter		179	25	3200 ISO	No custom buttons on the body		Tiltable 180° up	No viewfinder	In body pop-up tiltable flash	1020 mAh NP-FW50	283 g		No 4k video	30 min video duration limit	NO S&Q Slow and Quick video	1347 DxOMark Low Light ISO		N/A	3.10	Entry level	2014-08-18	Discontinued
Sony α7 II	ILCE-7M2	2015-01		340	α (Alpha)	MILC	Full frame, 35.8×23.9mm, (1.0×)	CMOS, Exmor HD, 24.3 MP	No touch to focus	No touch menus	5 axis IBIS	AF-S	1/8000 s	5 fps without live view (HI), 2.5 fps with live view (LO)	No Silent Electronic Shutter		117	25															Multi Interface Shoe	4.00	Semi-Professional	2014-11-20	Discontinued
Sony α7R II	ILCE-7RM2	2015-06		347	α (Alpha)	MILC	Full frame, 35.8×23.9mm, (1.0×)	BSI CMOS, Exmor R HD, 42.4 MP	No touch to focus	No touch menus	5 axis IBIS	AF-C	1/8000 s	5 fps without live view (HI), 2.5 fps with live view (LO)	1/8000 s	5 fps without live view (HI), 2.5 fps with live view (LO)	399	25															Multi Interface Shoe	4.00	Semi-Professional	2015-06-10	Discontinued
Sony α7S II	ILCE-7SM2	2015-11		350	α (Alpha)	MILC	Full frame, 35.6×23.8mm, (1.0×)	CMOS, Exmor HD, 12.2 MP	No touch to focus	No touch menus	5 axis IBIS	AF-S	1/8000 s	5 fps without AF-C or live view, 2.5 fps with AF-C and live view	1/8000 s	5 fps without AF-C or live view, 2.5 fps with AF-C and live view	0	169															Multi Interface Shoe	3.00	Semi-Professional	2015-09-11	Current
Sony α7S III	ILCE-7SM3	2020-09		383	α (Alpha)	MILC	Full frame, 35.6×23.8mm, (1.0×)	CMOS, Exmor HD, 12.1 MP			5 axis IBIS		1/8000 s				759	425								614g							Multi Interface Shoe	2.00	Semi-Professional	2020-07-28	Current
Sony α6300	ILCE-6300	2016-03		357	α (Alpha)	MILC	APS-C, ca. 23.5×15.6mm (1.5×)	CMOS, Exmor, 24.2 MP	No touch to focus	No touch menus	No IBIS	AF-C	1/4000 s	11 fps without live view (HI+), 8 fps with live view (HI)	1/4000 s electronic shutter	2.5 fps in silent mode (LO)	425	169		C1, C2, AEL, AF/MF, Rotary dial		Tiltable 45° down and 90° up	2359 k dots, 100 Hz viewfinder	In body pop-up tiltable flash	1020 mAh NP-FW50	403 g		4k video	30 min video duration limit	1 fps to 120 fps S&Q Slow and Quick video	1437 DxOMark Low Light ISO	Battery can be charged with micro-USB cable or in external charger. Can't be charged while in use.	Multi Interface Shoe	2.01	Advanced Amateur	2016-02-03	Discontinued
Sony α6500	ILCE-6500	2016-12		360	α (Alpha)	MILC	APS-C, ca. 23.5×15.6mm (1.5×)	CMOS, Exmor, 24.2 MP	Touch to focus	No touch menus	5 axis IBIS	AF-C	1/4000 s	11 fps without live view (HI+), 8 fps with live view (HI)	1/4000 s electronic shutter	2.5 fps in silent mode (LO)	425	169	6400 ISO	C1, C2, C3, AEL, AF/MF, Rotary dial		Tiltable 45° down and 90° up	2359 k dots, 100 Hz viewfinder	In body pop-up tiltable flash	1020 mAh NP-FW50	453 g		4k video	30 min video duration limit	1 fps to 120 fps S&Q Slow and Quick video	1405 DxOMark Low Light ISO	CAN be charged while in use. Battery can be charged with micro-USB cable or in external charger.	Multi Interface Shoe	1.05	Advanced Amateur	2016-10-06	Discontinued
Sony α9	ILCE-9	2017-05		358	α (Alpha)	MILC	Full frame, 35.9×24.0mm, (1.0×)	CMOS, Exmor HD, 24.2 MP	Touch to focus	No touch menus	5 axis IBIS	Real-time	1/8000 s	5 fps (HI+)	1/32,768 electronic shutter only works in M and S modes	20 fps (HI+), 10 fps (HI) in silent mode	693	425		C1, C2, C3, C4, AEL, AF-On, 2xRotary dial, Exposure compensation		Tiltable 45° down and 90° up	3686 k dots, 100 Hz viewfinder	NO in body pop-up tiltable flash	2280 mAh NP-FZ100	673 g		4k video	30 min video duration limit	1 fps to 120 fps S&Q Slow and Quick video	3517 DxOMark Low Light ISO		Multi Interface Shoe	4.10	Professional	2017-04-19	Current
Sony α7R III	ILCE-7RM3	2017-11		362	α (Alpha)	MILC	Full frame, 35.8×23.9mm, (1.0×)	BSI CMOS, Exmor R HD, 42.4 MP	Touch to focus	No touch menus	5 axis IBIS	Real-time	1/8000 s	10 fps without live view (HI+), 8 fps with live view (HI)	1/8000 s	10 fps without live view (HI+), 8 fps with live view (HI)	399	425		C1, C2, C3, C4, AEL, AF-On, 2xRotary dial, Exposure compensation		Tiltable 45° down and 90° up	2359 k dots, 100 Hz viewfinder	NO in body pop-up tiltable flash	2280 mAh NP-FZ100				30 min video duration limit	1 fps to 120 fps S&Q Slow and Quick video			Multi Interface Shoe	2.10	Professional	2017-10-25	Current
Sony α7 III	ILCE-7M3	2018-04		363	α (Alpha)	MILC	Full frame, 35.8×23.9mm, (1.0×)	BSI CMOS, Exmor R HD, 24.2 MP	Touch to focus	No touch menus	5 axis IBIS	Real-time	1/8000 s	10 fps without live view (HI+), 8 fps with live view (HI)	1/8000 s	10 fps without live view (HI+), 8 fps with live view (HI)	693	425		C1, C2, C3, C4, AEL, AF-On, 2xRotary dial, Exposure compensation		Tiltable 45° down and 90° up	2359 k dots, 100 Hz viewfinder	NO in body pop-up tiltable flash	2280 mAh NP-FZ100	650 g		4k video	30 min video duration limit	1 fps to 120 fps S&Q Slow and Quick video	3730 DxOMark Low Light ISO		Multi Interface Shoe	2.10	Semi-Professional	2018-02-27	Current
Sony α6400	ILCE-6400	2019-04		371	α (Alpha)	MILC	APS-C, ca. 23.5×15.6mm (1.5×)	CMOS, Exmor, 24.2 MP	Touch to focus	No touch menus	No IBIS	Real-time	1/4000 s	11 fps without live view (HI+), 8 fps with live view (HI)	1/4000 s electronic shutter	2.5 fps in silent mode (LO)	425	425		C1, C2, AEL, Rotary dial		Tiltable 45° down and 180° up	2359 k dots, 100 Hz viewfinder	In body pop-up tiltable flash	1020 mAh NP-FW50	404 g		4k video	unlimited video duration	1 fps to 120 fps S&Q Slow and Quick video	1431 DxOMark Low Light ISO		Multi Interface Shoe	?	Advanced Amateur	2019-01-15	Current
Sony α7R IV	ILCE-7RM4	2019-09		375	α (Alpha)	MILC	Full frame, 35.7×23.8mm (1.0×)	BSI CMOS, Exmor R HD, 61 MP	Touch to focus	No touch menus	5 axis IBIS	Real-time	1/8000 s	10 fps	1/8000 s	10 fps	567	425	32.000 ISO	C1, C2, C3, C4, AEL, AF-On, 2 rotary dials, exposure compensation		Tiltable 45° down and 90° up	5.760 k dots, 100–120 Hz viewfinder	NO in body pop-up tiltable flash	2280 mAh NP-FZ100	665 g		4k video	unlimited video duration	1 fps to 120 fps S&Q Slow and Quick video	3344 DxOMark Low Light ISO	Can be charged while in use. Battery can be charged with micro-USB cable, USB-C-cable, or in external charger.	Multi Interface Shoe	1.20	Professional	2019-07-16	Discontinued
Sony α6600	ILCE-6600	2019-10		378	α (Alpha)	MILC	APS-C, ca. 23.5×15.6mm (1.5×)	CMOS, Exmor, 24.2 MP	Touch to focus	No touch menus	5 axis IBIS	Real-time	1/4000 s	11 fps without live view (HI+), 8 fps with live view (HI)	1/4000 s electronic shutter	2.5 fps in silent mode (LO)	425	425		C1, C2, C3, C4, AEL, AF/MF, Rotary dial		Tiltable 45° down and 180° up	2359 k dots, 100 Hz viewfinder	No in body pop-up tiltable flash	2280 mAh NP-FZ100	503 g		4k video	unlimited video duration	1 fps to 120 fps S&Q Slow and Quick video			Multi Interface Shoe	2.00	Advanced Amateur	2019-08-28	Current
Sony α6100	ILCE-6100	2019-10		379	α (Alpha)	MILC	APS-C, ca. 23.5×15.6mm (1.5×)	CMOS, Exmor, 24.2 MP	Touch to focus	No touch menus	No IBIS	Real-time	1/4000 s	11 fps without live view (HI+), 8 fps with live view (HI)	1/4000 s electronic shutter	2.5 fps in silent mode (LO)	425	425		C1, C2, AEL, Rotary dial		Tiltable 45° down and 180° up	1440 k dots viewfinder	In body pop-up tiltable flash	1020 mAh NP-FW50	396 g		4k video	unlimited video duration	1 fps to 120 fps S&Q Slow and Quick video			Multi Interface Shoe		Advanced Amateur	2019-08-28	Discontinued
Sony α9 II	ILCE-9M2	2019-10		376	α (Alpha)	MILC	Full frame, 35.6×23.8mm (1.0×)	BSI Stacked CMOS, Exmor RS, 24.2 MP	Touch to focus	No touch menus	5 axis IBIS	Real-time	1/8000 s	Hi: max. 10fps	1/32000	Hi: max. 20 fps	693	425					3686 k dots, STD 60fps / HI 120fps	NO in body pop-up tiltable flash	2280 mAh NP-FZ100	678 g		4k video	unlimited video duration				Multi Interface Shoe		Professional	2019-10-03	Current
Sony α7C	ILCE-7C	2020-10		381	α (Alpha)	MILC	35mm full frame (35.6 x 23.8mm)	CMOS, Exmor R, 24.2 MP			5 axis IBIS				1/4000 s electronic shutter		693	425				Articulating screen	2,359,296 dots viewfinder			509g		4k video	unlimited video duration				Multi Interface Shoe		Advanced Amateur	2020-09-14	Current
Sony α1	ILCE-1	2021-01		384	α (Alpha)	MILC	35 mm full frame (35.9 x 23.9 mm)	BSI Stacked CMOS, Exmor RS, 50.1 MP	Touch to focus	Touch menus	5 axis IBIS	Real-time	1/8000 s	Hi: max. 30fps	1/8000 s mechanical shutter; 1/32000 s electronic shutter		759	425		C1, C2, C3, C4, AEL, AF/MF, Rotary dial		Tiltable 41° down and 107° up	9.4M dots viewfinder	No flash	2280 mAh NP-FZ100	737g	1920 x 1080	8k video	unlimited video duration			Can be charged while in use. Battery can be charged with micro-USB cable, USB-C-cable, or in external charger.	Multi Interface Shoe		Flagship	2021-1-27	Current
Sony α7 IV	ILCE-7M4	2021-10		388	α (Alpha)	MILC	35 mm full frame (35.9 x 23.9 mm)	CMOS, Exmor R, 34.1 MP	Touch to focus	Touch menus	5 axis IBIS	Real-time	1/8000 s	Hi: max. 10fps	1/8000 s electronic shutter		759	425		C1, C2, C3, C4, AEL, AF/MF, Rotary dial		Articulating screen	3,686,400 dots viewfinder	No flash	2280 mAh NP-FZ100	665g	1920 x 1080	4k video	unlimited video duration			Can be charged while in use. Battery can be charged with micro-USB cable, USB-C-cable, or in external charger.	Multi Interface Shoe		Semi-Professional	2021-10-21	Current
Sony α7R V	ILCE-7RM5	2022-12		390	a (Alpha)	MILC	35mm full frame (35.7 x 23.8 mm)	CMOS, Exmor R, 61.0 MP	Touch to focus	Touch menus	5 axis IBIS	Real-time	1/8000 s	Hi: max. 10fps	1/8000 s electronic shutter		759	425						No in body pop-up flash.			3840 x 2860	4k video	unlimited video duration			Can be charged while in use. Battery can be charged with micro-USB cable, USB-C-cable, or in external charger.	Multi Interface Shoe		Semi-Professional	2022-10-26	Current
Sony α QX1	ILCE-QX1	2014-10		346	α (Alpha) QX-series	MILC (lens-type, smartphone-mounted)	APS-C, approx. 23.2×15.4mm (1.5×)	CMOS, 20.1 MP									0	25															None	Unknown	Advanced Amateur	2014-09-03	Discontinued
Sony NEX-VG10	NEX-VG10E, NEX-VG10A, NEX-VG10J	2010-09	CX36000, CX36001		Handycam	Camcorder	APS-C, 23.4×15.6mm (1.5×)	CMOS, Exmor HD, 14.2 MP									0	25															Auto-lock Accessory Shoe (4-pin iISO)	3	Advanced Amateur	2010-05-11, 2010-07-14	Discontinued
Sony NEX-VG20	NEX-VG20E, NEX-VG20A, NEX-VG20J	2011-11	CX36100	290	Handycam	Camcorder	APS-C, 23.4×15.6mm (1.5×)	CMOS, Exmor HD, 16.1 MP									0	25															Auto-lock Accessory Shoe (4-pin iISO)	1	Advanced Amateur	2011-08-24	Discontinued
Sony NEX-VG30	NEX-VG30E	2012-11	CX43500?	300	Handycam	Camcorder	APS-C, 23.4×15.6mm (1.5×)	CMOS, Exmor HD, 16.1 MP									0	25															Multi Interface Shoe + ISO-518 (0-pin)	1	Advanced Amateur	2012-09-12	Discontinued
Sony NEX-VG900	NEX-VG900E	2012-11	CX45600	299	Handycam	Camcorder	Full frame, 35.8×23.9mm, (1.0×)	CMOS, Exmor HD, 24.3 MP									0	25															Multi Interface Shoe	1	Semi-Professional	2012-09-12	Discontinued
Sony NEX-FS100	NEX-FS100E, NEX-FS100U, NEX-FS100J	2011-07	CX94500, CX94600		NXCAM	Camcorder	Super-35mm, 23.6×13.3mm (1.6×)	CMOS, Exmor HD, 3.5 MP									0	25																2	Semi-Professional	2010-11-17, 2011-03-23	Discontinued
Sony NEX-FS700	NEX-FS700E, NEX-FS700U, NEX-FS700J, NEX-FS700R	2012-06	CX96000, CX96100		NXCAM	Camcorder	Super-35mm, 23.6×13.3mm, (1.6×)	CMOS, Exmor 4K, 11.6 MP																										2 (non-R w/o 4K), 3 (NEX-FS700R w/ 4K)	Professional	2012-04-02	Discontinued
Sony NEX-EA50	NEX-EA50E, NEX-EA50U	2012-11	CX95100, CX95300		NXCAM	Camcorder	APS-C, 23.5×15.6 mm (1.5×)	CMOS, Exmor HD, 16.1 MP																									ISO-518 (2-pin)	2	Semi-Professional	2012-08-17	Discontinued
Sony PXW-FS7	PXW-FS7	2014-11			XDCAM	Camcorder	Super-35mm, 23.6×13.3mm, (1.6×)	CMOS, Exmor 4K, 11.6 MP																									ISO-518 cold shoe		Professional	2014-09-12	Discontinued
Sony PXW-FS5	PXW-FS5	2015-11			XDCAM	Camcorder	Super-35mm, 23.6×13.3mm, (1.6×)	CMOS, Exmor 4K, 11.6 MP																									ISO-518 cold shoe		Professional		Discontinued
Sony PXW-FS7 II	PXW-FS7	2017-01			XDCAM	Camcorder	Super-35mm, 23.6×13.3mm, (1.6×)	CMOS, Exmor 4K, 11.6 MP																									ISO-518 cold shoe		Professional		Current
Sony VENICE	VENICE	2018-02			CineAlta	Digital Cinema Camera	Full frame, 36.2×24.1mm, (1.0×)	CMOS, 6K, 24.4 MP																										4.0	Professional		Current
Sony PXW-FS5 II	PXW-FS5	2018-06			XDCAM	Camcorder	Super-35mm, 23.6×13.3mm, (1.6×)	CMOS, Exmor 4K, 11.6 MP																											Professional		Current
Sony PXW-FX9	PXW-FX9	2019-12			XDCAM	Camcorder	Full frame, 36.2×24.1mm, (1.0×)	CMOS, 6K, 24.4 MP																											Professional		Current
Sony FX6	ILME-FX6V / ILME-FX6VK	2020-11			α (Alpha)	Camcorder	Full frame, 35.6×23.8mm, (1.0×)	CMOS, EXMOR R, 12.9 MP																											Professional		Current
Sony FX3	ILME-FX3	2021-03		385	α (Alpha)	MILC	Full frame, 35.6×23.8mm, (1.0×)	CMOS, EXMOR R, 12.1 MP									759 (stills) 627 (movie)																		Professional		Current
Sony ZV-E10		2021-07		382			APS-C, 23.4×15.6mm (1.5×)	CMOS, Exmor R, 24.2 MP									425	425																			
Sony ZV-E1		2023-05		393			Full frame, 35.6×23.8mm, (1.0×)	CMOS, Exmor R, 12.1 MP									759 (stills) 627 (movie)																				
Sony α6700	ILCE-6700	2023-08		394	α (Alpha)	MILC	APS-C, 23.3×15.5 mm (1.5×)	CMOS, Exmor R, 26.0 MP	Touch to focus	Touch menus	5 axis IBIS	Real-time	1/4000 s	11 fps without live view (HI+), 8 fps with live view (HI)	1/8000 s electronic shutter		759 (stills) 495 (movie)	425	32,000 ISO	C1, C2, C3, AF-ON, Front rotary dial, Rear rotary dial		Articulating screen	2359 k dots, 100 Hz viewfinder	No in body pop-up tiltable flash	2280 mAh NP-FZ100	409 g		4k video	unlimited video duration	1 fps to 240 fps S&Q Slow and Quick video			Multi Interface Shoe	2.00	Advanced Amateur	2023-07-12	Current
Sony α7C II	ILCE-7CM2	2023-09		397	α (Alpha)	MILC	35mm full frame (35.9 x 23.9mm)	CMOS, Exmor R, 33.0 MP			5 axis IBIS	Real-time	1/4000 s electronic shutter	Hi: max. 10fps	1/8000 s electronic shutter		759	425	12,800 ISO			Articulating screen	2,359,296 dots viewfinder		2280 mAh NP-FZ100	429 g		4k video	Unlimited video duration				Multi Interface Shoe		Advanced Amateur	2023-08-29	Current
Sony α7CR	ILCE-7CR	2023-09		396	α (Alpha)	MILC	35mm full frame (35.7 x 23.8 mm)	CMOS, Exmor R, 62.5 MP			5 axis IBIS	Real-time	1/4000 s electronic shutter	Hi: max. 8fps	1/8000 s electronic shutter		693		32,000 ISO			Articulating screen	2,359,296 dots viewfinder		2280 mAh NP-FZ100	430 g		4k video	Unlimited video duration				Multi Interface Shoe		Advanced Amateur	2023-08-29	Current
Sony α1 II	ILCE-1M2	2024-12		400	α (Alpha)	MILC	35mm full frame (35.7 x 23.8 mm)	BSI Stacked CMOS, Exmor RS, 50.1 MP	Touch to focus	Touch menus	5 axis IBIS	Real-time	1/8000 s	Hi: max. 30fps	1/8000 s mechanical shutter; 1/32000 s electronic shutter		759		32,000 ISO	C1, C2, C3, C4, C5, AEL, AF/MF, Rotary dial		Articulating screen	9.4M dots viewfinder		2280 mAh NP-FZ100	746 g		8k video	Unlimited video duration	4K 120fps, 1080p 240fps			Multi Interface Shoe		Flagship	2024-11-19	Current
Sony α9 III	ILCE-9M3	2024-02		392	α (Alpha)	MILC	35mm full frame (35.7 x 23.8 mm)	CMOS, Exmor RS, 24.60 MP with global shutter	Touch to focus	Touch menus	5 axis IBIS	Real-time			1/ 80000	120 fps	759		25,600 ISO	C1, C2, C3, C4, C5, AEL, AF/MF, Rotary dial	236	2 095 104 dots tilt-and-articulating LCD	9 437 184 dots EVF		2280 mAh NP-FZ100	702 g		4K video	Unlimited video duration	4K 120fps, 1080p 120fps			Multi interface shoe		Flagship		Current
Sony α7 V	ILCE-7M5	2025-12		407	α (Alpha)	MILC	35mm full frame (35.7 x 23.8 mm)	partially stacked Exmor RS™ CMOS sensor, 33.0 MP	Touch to focus	Touch menus	5-axis IBIS	Real-time					759	425																		2025-12-2	
Sony ZV-E10 II	ZV-E10 M2	2024-06		399			APS-C, 23.4×15.6mm (1.5×)	CMOS, Exmor R, 26 MP	Touch to focus		no IBIS	Real-time			1/8000		759 (stills) 495 (movie)																Multi Interface Shoe			2024-06-10	Current
Name	Model	Release date	Code	ID	System	Type	Format (crop f.)	Sensor	Touch to focus	Touch menus	5 axis IBIS	Eye AF	Fastest mech. shutter speed	Max FPS Cont. Shooting Mech. shutter	Fastest elec. shutter speed	Max FPS Cont. Shooting Elec. shutter	Phase Detect AF points	Contrast AF points	Max ISO in Auto modes	Custom buttons on the body	Mem. buffer	Screen	Viewfinder	Flash	Battery	Weight	Full HD Video	4k Video	Video duration limit	S&Q Slow and Quick video	DxOMark Low Light ISO	Charging	Hotshoe	Latest firmware	User level	Announce date	Availability

== See also ==
- List of Sony E-mount lenses
- List of Sony α cameras
- List of Sony A-mount cameras

Family	Level	Format	'10	2011		2012	2013	2014	2015	2016	2017	2018	2019	2020	2021	2022	2023	2024	2025	2026
Alpha (α)	Indust	FF																ILX-LR1 ^{●}		
Alpha (α)	Cine line	FF													_{m} FX6 ^{●}					
Alpha (α)	Cine line	FF																		_{m} FX5 ^{AT●}
Alpha (α)	Cine line	FF													_{m} FX3 ^{AT●}					
Alpha (α)	Cine line	FF																		_{m} FX2 ^{AT●}
Alpha (α)	Flag	FF													_{m} α1 ^{FT●}				_{m} α1 II ^{FAT●}	
Alpha (α)	Speed	FF										_{m} α9 ^{FT●}			_{m} α9 II ^{FT●}				_{m} α9 III ^{FAT●}	
Alpha (α)	Sens	FF							_{m} α7S ^{●}	_{m} α7S II ^{F●}					_{m} α7S III ^{AT●}					
Alpha (α)	Hi-Res	FF						_{m} α7R ^{●}		_{m} α7R II ^{F●}		_{m} α7R III ^{FT●}		_{m} α7R IV ^{FT●}			_{m} α7R V ^{FAT●}			_{m} α7R VI ^{FAT●}
Alpha (α)	Basic	FF						_{m} α7 ^{F●}	_{m} α7 II ^{F●}				_{m} α7 III ^{FT●}			_{m} α7 IV ^{AT●}				_{m} α7 V ^{FAT●}
Alpha (α)	Compact	FF																_{m} α7CR ^{AT●}		
Alpha (α)	Compact	FF													_{m} α7C ^{AT●}			_{m} α7C II ^{AT●}		
Alpha (α)	Vlog	FF																_{m} ZV-E1 ^{AT●}		
Alpha (α)	Cine	APS-C															_{m} FX30 ^{AT●}			
Alpha (α)	Adv	APS-C			_{s} NEX-7 ^{F●}						_{m} α6500 ^{FT●}			_{m} α6600 ^{FT●}				_{m} α6700 ^{AT●}		
Alpha (α)	Mid-range	APS-C				_{m} NEX-6 ^{F●}					_{m} α6300 ^{F●}		_{m} α6400 ^{F+T●}							
Alpha (α)	Mid-range	APS-C						_{m} α6000 ^{F●}						_{m} α6100 ^{FT●}						
Alpha (α)	Vlog	APS-C														_{m} ZV-E10 ^{AT●}			_{m} ZV-E10 II ^{AT●}	
Alpha (α)	Entry-level	APS-C	NEX-5 ^{F●}	NEX-5N ^{FT●}		NEX-5R ^{F+T●}	NEX-5T ^{F+T●}		α5100 ^{F+T●}											
Alpha (α)	Entry-level	APS-C	NEX-3 ^{F●}	NEX-C3 ^{F●}		NEX-F3 ^{F+●}	NEX-3N ^{F+●}	α5000 ^{F+●}												
DSLR-style		APS-C					_{m} α3000 ^{●}		_{m} α3500 ^{●}											
SmartShot		APS-C							QX1 ^{M●}											
CineAlta	Cine line	FF										VENICE				VENICE 2				
CineAlta	Cine line	FF																BURANO		
XDCAM	Cine line	FF												_{m} FX9						
XDCAM	Docu	S35							_{m} FS7		_{m} FS7 II									
XDCAM	Mobile	S35								_{m} FS5			_{m} FS5 II							
NXCAM	Pro	S35		NEX-FS100		NEX-FS700	NEX-FS700R													
NXCAM	APS-C					NEX-EA50														
Handycam	FF					_{m} NEX-VG900														
Handycam	APS-C		_{s} NEX-VG10		_{s} NEX-VG20	_{m} NEX-VG30														
Security		FF									SNC-VB770									
Security		FF									UMC-S3C									
Family	Level	Format																		
Family	Level	Format	'10	2011		2012	2013	2014	2015	2016	2017	2018	2019	2020	2021	2022	2023	2024	2025	2026
