= Sony FX3 =

2021 full-frame compact cinema camera

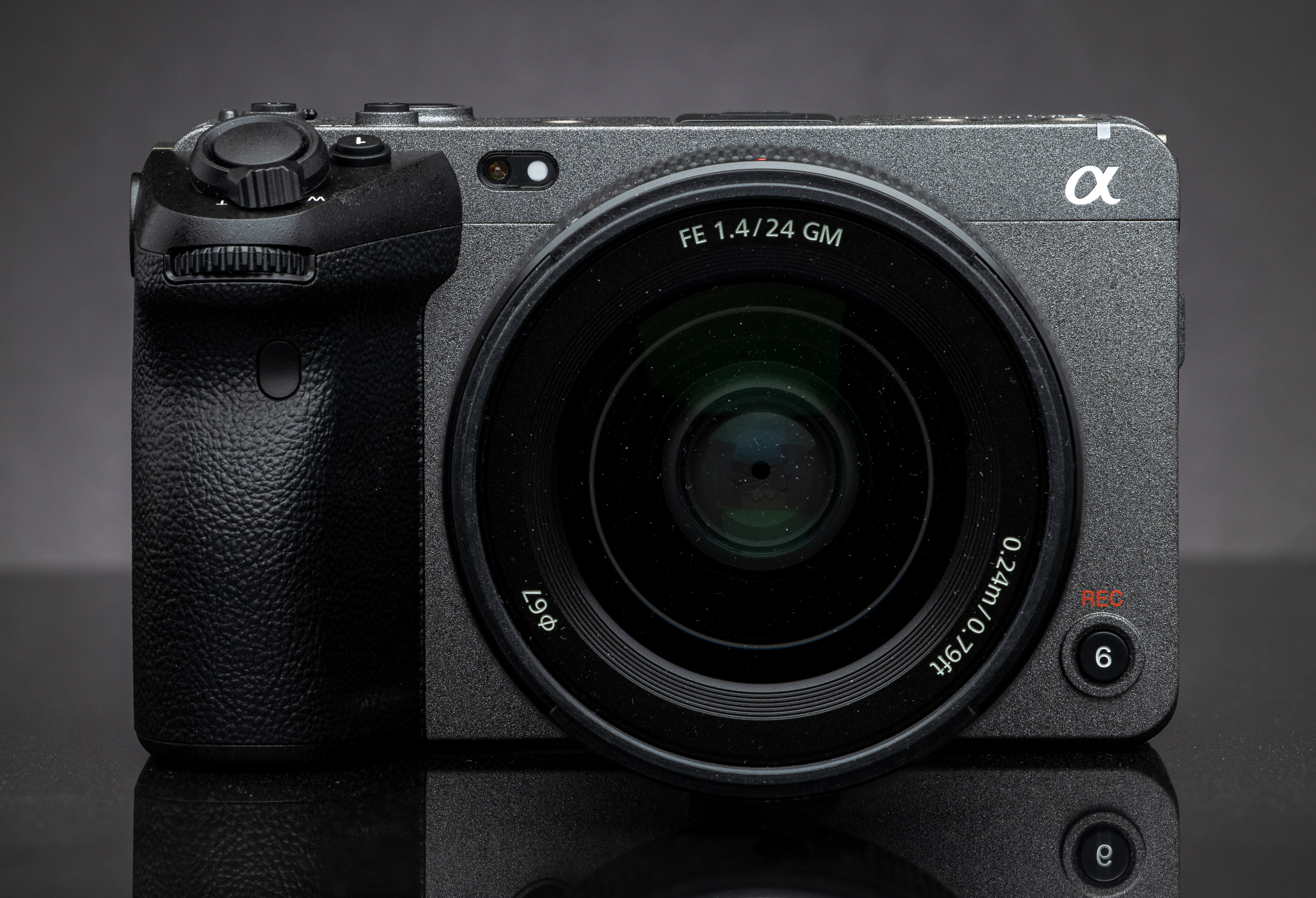

Overview
- Maker: Sony
- Type: Full Frame MILC
- Released: February 23, 2021; 5 years ago
- Intro price: MSRP: USD 3900 (body)

Lens
- Lens mount: Sony E-mount
- Lens: Interchangeable lens

Sensor/medium
- Sensor: Full Frame
- Sensor type: Exmor R CMOS Sensor
- Sensor size: 35.6mm x 23.8mm Full Frame
- Sensor maker: Sony
- Maximum resolution: 12 megapixels 4240 × 2832
- Film speed: ISO 80–102400, ISO 40-409600 Dual Gain Modes: S-Log 2 / S-Log 3: Low Base ISO 640 / High Base ISO 12,800 HLG: Low Base ISO 100 / High Base ISO 2000 Cine 2: Low Base ISO 50 / High Base ISO 1000
- Storage media: Dual Slot SD, SDHC, SDXC, CFexpress A UHS-II, UHS-I, CFexpress

Flash
- Flash: External flash
- Flash synchronization: 1/250 s
- Compatible flashes: Shoe Mount flash

Shutter
- Shutter: Electronically-controlled, vertical-traverse, focal-plane type
- Shutter speeds: 1/8000 to 30 seconds, bulb
- Continuous shooting: Hi+: 10fps, Hi: 8fps, Mid: 6fps, Lo: 3fps

Image processing
- Image processor: BIONZ XR

General
- Video recording: XAVC S, XAVC HS; 4K up to 120 fps, 1080p up to 120 fps, Raw 4.2k 16bit
- LCD screen: 3.0" 1.44M dots (800 x 600 pixels) (SVGA) touchscreen variable-angle monitor
- Battery: NP-FZ100 Li-ion
- AV port(s): HDMI A, ⌀3.5 mm audio jack
- Data port: USB-C 3.2, Wi-Fi 5, Bluetooth 5.0, NFC 3
- Body features: Active Mode optical image stabilization, Image Sensor-Shift mechanism with 5-axis compensation, Anti-Dust System
- Dimensions: 129.7 mm × 77.8 mm × 84.5 mm (5.11 in × 3.06 in × 3.33 in)
- Weight: 1,015 g (2.238 lb) including battery, memory card and XLR handle
- Made in: Thailand

Chronology
- Successor: Sony FX3A

The Sony FX3 is a full-frame mirrorless interchangeable-lens compact cinema camera announced on February 23, 2021. Based on the previous year's Sony α7S III, it became available in March 2021. The starting price of $3,900 (£4,200) made it one of the most affordable models in Sony's Cinema line aimed at professional filmmakers.

An upgraded Sony FX3A was released in May 2025 with a better rear screen and IR connectivity removed.

== Features ==
=== Improved FX3 features ===
- Comfortable, cage-free, handheld operation
- Greater than 1.6x battery runtime compared to a7S III
- USB-PD power option for extended shooting time

=== Common FX3 features ===
- Full-frame camera
- Back-illuminated 12.1MP Exmor R CMOS sensor
- BIONZ XR processor
- High-speed rates of 120p in 4K and 240p in HD
- Dynamic range of 15+ stops

=== Shared FX3/A7S III attributes ===
- 5-axis in-body image stabilization
- 16-bit raw output via HDMI
- S-Log2 gamma choice
- 80 to 409,600 ISO range (expanded)

=== Cinematic recording ===
The FX3 comes with an S-Cinetone, a video preset used by Sony's cinema cameras. It can do UHD 4K capture similar to α7S III camera. The FX-3's video-forward design also shares several handling and audio features with the FX6 and the ISO range and battery of the a7S III.

== See also ==
- List of Sony E-mount cameras
- Sony α7S III

Family	Level	Format	'10	2011		2012	2013	2014	2015	2016	2017	2018	2019	2020	2021	2022	2023	2024	2025	2026
Alpha (α)	Indust	FF																ILX-LR1 ^{●}		
Alpha (α)	Cine line	FF													_{m} FX6 ^{●}					
Alpha (α)	Cine line	FF																		_{m} FX5 ^{AT●}
Alpha (α)	Cine line	FF													_{m} FX3 ^{AT●}					
Alpha (α)	Cine line	FF																		_{m} FX2 ^{AT●}
Alpha (α)	Flag	FF													_{m} α1 ^{FT●}				_{m} α1 II ^{FAT●}	
Alpha (α)	Speed	FF										_{m} α9 ^{FT●}			_{m} α9 II ^{FT●}				_{m} α9 III ^{FAT●}	
Alpha (α)	Sens	FF							_{m} α7S ^{●}	_{m} α7S II ^{F●}					_{m} α7S III ^{AT●}					
Alpha (α)	Hi-Res	FF						_{m} α7R ^{●}		_{m} α7R II ^{F●}		_{m} α7R III ^{FT●}		_{m} α7R IV ^{FT●}			_{m} α7R V ^{FAT●}			_{m} α7R VI ^{FAT●}
Alpha (α)	Basic	FF						_{m} α7 ^{F●}	_{m} α7 II ^{F●}				_{m} α7 III ^{FT●}			_{m} α7 IV ^{AT●}				_{m} α7 V ^{FAT●}
Alpha (α)	Compact	FF																_{m} α7CR ^{AT●}		
Alpha (α)	Compact	FF													_{m} α7C ^{AT●}			_{m} α7C II ^{AT●}		
Alpha (α)	Vlog	FF																_{m} ZV-E1 ^{AT●}		
Alpha (α)	Cine	APS-C															_{m} FX30 ^{AT●}			
Alpha (α)	Adv	APS-C			_{s} NEX-7 ^{F●}						_{m} α6500 ^{FT●}			_{m} α6600 ^{FT●}				_{m} α6700 ^{AT●}		
Alpha (α)	Mid-range	APS-C				_{m} NEX-6 ^{F●}					_{m} α6300 ^{F●}		_{m} α6400 ^{F+T●}							
Alpha (α)	Mid-range	APS-C						_{m} α6000 ^{F●}						_{m} α6100 ^{FT●}						
Alpha (α)	Vlog	APS-C														_{m} ZV-E10 ^{AT●}			_{m} ZV-E10 II ^{AT●}	
Alpha (α)	Entry-level	APS-C	NEX-5 ^{F●}	NEX-5N ^{FT●}		NEX-5R ^{F+T●}	NEX-5T ^{F+T●}		α5100 ^{F+T●}											
Alpha (α)	Entry-level	APS-C	NEX-3 ^{F●}	NEX-C3 ^{F●}		NEX-F3 ^{F+●}	NEX-3N ^{F+●}	α5000 ^{F+●}												
DSLR-style		APS-C					_{m} α3000 ^{●}		_{m} α3500 ^{●}											
SmartShot		APS-C							QX1 ^{M●}											
CineAlta	Cine line	FF										VENICE				VENICE 2				
CineAlta	Cine line	FF																BURANO		
XDCAM	Cine line	FF												_{m} FX9						
XDCAM	Docu	S35							_{m} FS7		_{m} FS7 II									
XDCAM	Mobile	S35								_{m} FS5			_{m} FS5 II							
NXCAM	Pro	S35		NEX-FS100		NEX-FS700	NEX-FS700R													
NXCAM	APS-C					NEX-EA50														
Handycam	FF					_{m} NEX-VG900														
Handycam	APS-C		_{s} NEX-VG10		_{s} NEX-VG20	_{m} NEX-VG30														
Security		FF									SNC-VB770									
Security		FF									UMC-S3C									
Family	Level	Format																		
Family	Level	Format	'10	2011		2012	2013	2014	2015	2016	2017	2018	2019	2020	2021	2022	2023	2024	2025	2026
