= Sony α7S III =

2020 full-frame mirrorless camera

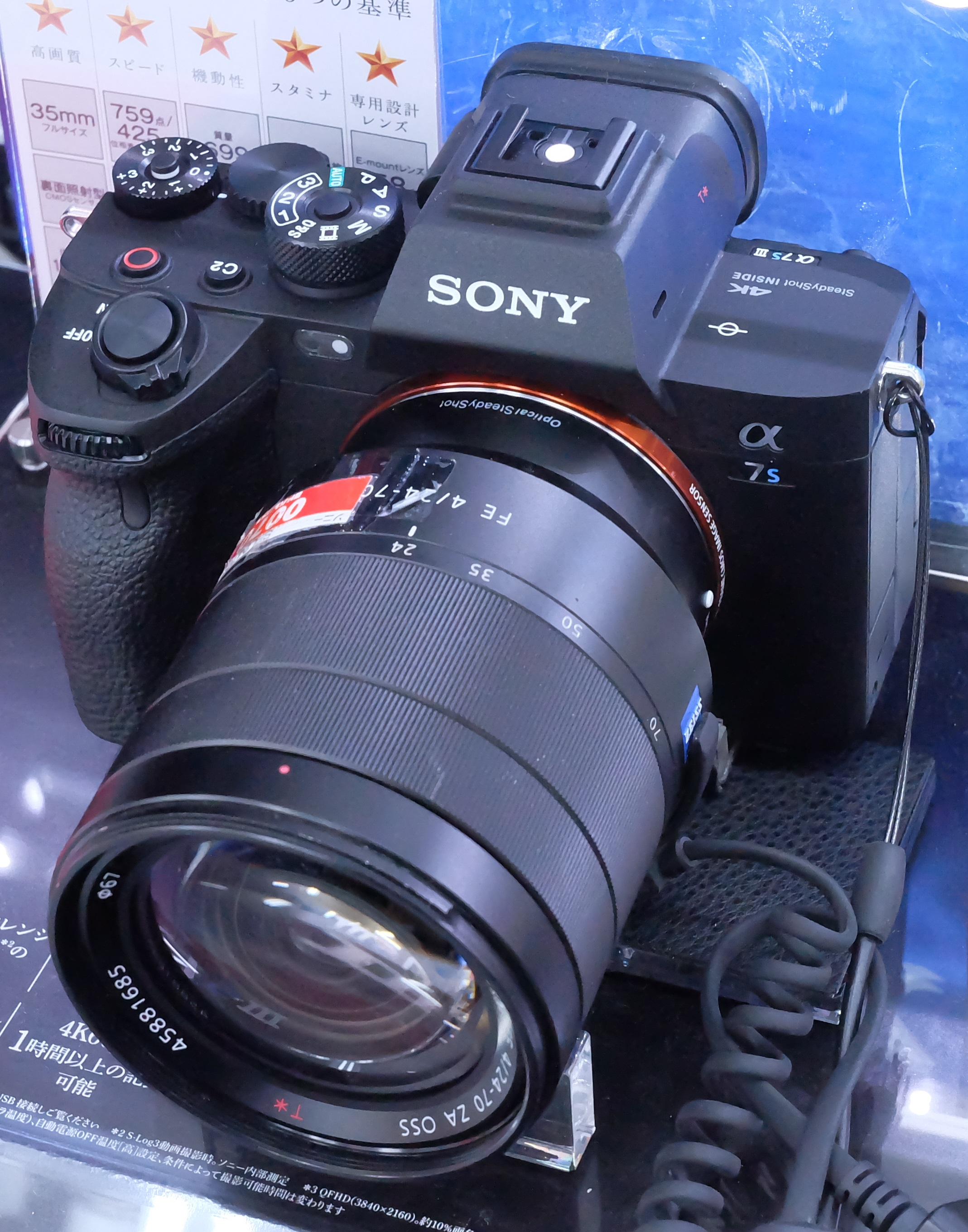

Overview
- Maker: Sony
- Type: Full Frame MILC
- Released: October 23, 2020; 6 years ago
- Intro price: MSRP: USD 3,495 (body) Street/Grey: USD 4,229 (2021)

Lens
- Lens mount: Sony E-mount
- Lens: Interchangeable lens

Sensor/medium
- Sensor: Full Frame
- Sensor type: Exmor R CMOS Sensor
- Sensor size: 35.6mm x 23.8mm Full Frame
- Sensor maker: Sony
- Maximum resolution: 12 megapixels 4240 × 2832
- Film speed: ISO 80–102400, ISO 40-409600 Dual Gain Modes: S-Log 2 / S-Log 3: Low Base ISO 640 / High Base ISO 12,800 HLG: Low Base ISO 100 / High Base ISO 2000 Cine 2: Low Base ISO 50 / High Base ISO 1000
- Storage media: Dual Slot SD, SDHC, SDXC, CFexpress A UHS-II, UHS-I, CFexpress

Flash
- Flash: External flash
- Flash synchronization: 1/250 s
- Compatible flashes: Shoe Mount flash

Shutter
- Shutter: Electronically-controlled, vertical-traverse, focal-plane type
- Shutter speeds: 1/8000 to 30 seconds, bulb
- Continuous shooting: 10 fps 12.2MP (photo) 60 fps 10.27MP 4.2k (video)

Viewfinder
- Viewfinder: EVF with eye sensor
- Electronic viewfinder: 0.64" 9.4M dots (2048 x 1536 pixels) (QXGA) OLED Viewfinder
- Viewfinder magnification: 1.09
- Frame coverage: 100%

Image processing
- Image processor: BIONZ XR

General
- Video recording: XAVC S, XAVC HS; 4K up to 120 fps, 1080p up to 120 fps, Raw 4.2k 16bit
- LCD screen: 3.0" 1.44M dots (800 x 600 pixels) (SVGA) touchscreen variable-angle monitor
- Battery: NP-FZ100 Li-ion
- AV port(s): HDMI A, ⌀3.5 mm audio jack
- Data port(s): USB-C 3.2, Wi-Fi, Bluetooth 5.0
- Body features: Active Mode optical image stabilization, Image Sensor-Shift mechanism with 5-axis compensation, Anti-Dust System
- Dimensions: 128.9 mm × 96.9 mm × 80.9 mm (5.07 in × 3.81 in × 3.19 in)
- Weight: 699 g (25 oz) (1.541 lb) including battery and memory card
- Made in: Thailand

The Sony α7S III (model ILCE-7SM3) is a 12.2-megapixel full-frame mirrorless interchangeable-lens camera made by Sony. It was publicly announced on July 28, 2020 online with a suggested retail price of US$3,495 (body only) at the time. The α7S III is offered as a body only.

== Specfications ==
- 12-megapixel (MP), backside illuminated (BSI), Exmor R-type CMOS sensor
- 9.44 million-dot viewfinder (2048 × 1536 pixels) (3.15 MP) (QXGA)
- Slow motion video recording at up to 240 fps in 1080p
- 4K recording at up to 120 fps with 10-bit color depth and 4:2:2 chroma subsampling, in XAVC HS; alternatively,
- 4K 120 fps with 10-bit color, or 4.2K 60 fps with 16-bit color, both without chroma subsampling, outputted as raw video over HDMI
- Dual film speed (ISO) gain modes
- 5-axis sensor-shift image stabilization, marketed as Optical Steadyshot (OSS)
- LCD touchscreen measured 3 inches (7.6 cm)-diagonal, fully articulated
- Multi Interface Shoe (supports new microphones using direct digital signal)
- Weather sealing, revised handling and cooling (one-layer disassembly for replacement of audio ports)
- Dual-function memory card slots for either SDXC UHS-II or CFexpress type A

=== Image features ===
The α7S III features a 35 mm (35.6 mm × 23.8 mm) full-frame Exmor CMOS sensor capable of capturing approximately 12.2 effective megapixels.

=== Autofocus and metering ===
The camera's 759-point autofocus sensor uses mainly phase detection but also 425 points contrast-detection AF to capture and record alongside subject tracking with high accuracy.

=== ISO ===
==== Manual setting ====
The α7S III's image sensor support native film speeds of 80–102400; an extended range of 40–409600 can be achieved by digital gain ("extended ISO"); video recording supports all film speeds except ISOs below 80.

==== Other modes ====
On full automatic mode, the camera selects between ISO 80–12800 by default. The slowest shutter speed, and the lower and upper ISO limits selectable by the camera, can be changed manually. When shooting with S-Log, the ISO is 12800.

=== Shutter ===
The α7S III's shutter speed range is 30 s to 1/8,000 s for still images. For bulb movies, the shutter speed range is 1/4 s (1/3 s step) to 1/8,000 s.

The camera has an approximate maximum continuous shooting speed of 10.0 frames per second in Speedy Priority Continuous shooting drive and Continuous shooting drive mode.

=== Ergonomics and functions ===
The α7S III has a TFT LCD screen with a size of 7.5 cm (3 inches) and resolution of 1,440,000 dots (800 × 600 pixels) (SVGA) with an adjustable tilt angle of 107 degrees up and 41 degrees down (approximate). The OLED electronic viewfinder has a resolution of 9,437,184 dots (2048 × 1536 pixels) (3.15 MP) (QXGA) and a .90x magnification.

The camera additionally has built-in Wi-Fi with NFC compatibility.

=== Video ===
The camera can record 4K UHD (QFHD: 3840 x 2160) internally in full frame format at 120 FPS. The camera allows for movie image size to be set, as well as the frame rate per second, and compression method. The camera can shoot in HLG and S-log internally.

== Accessories ==
The α7S III camera body comes with the following:

- Battery Pack NP-FZ100 (rechargeable)
- Battery Charger BC-QZ1
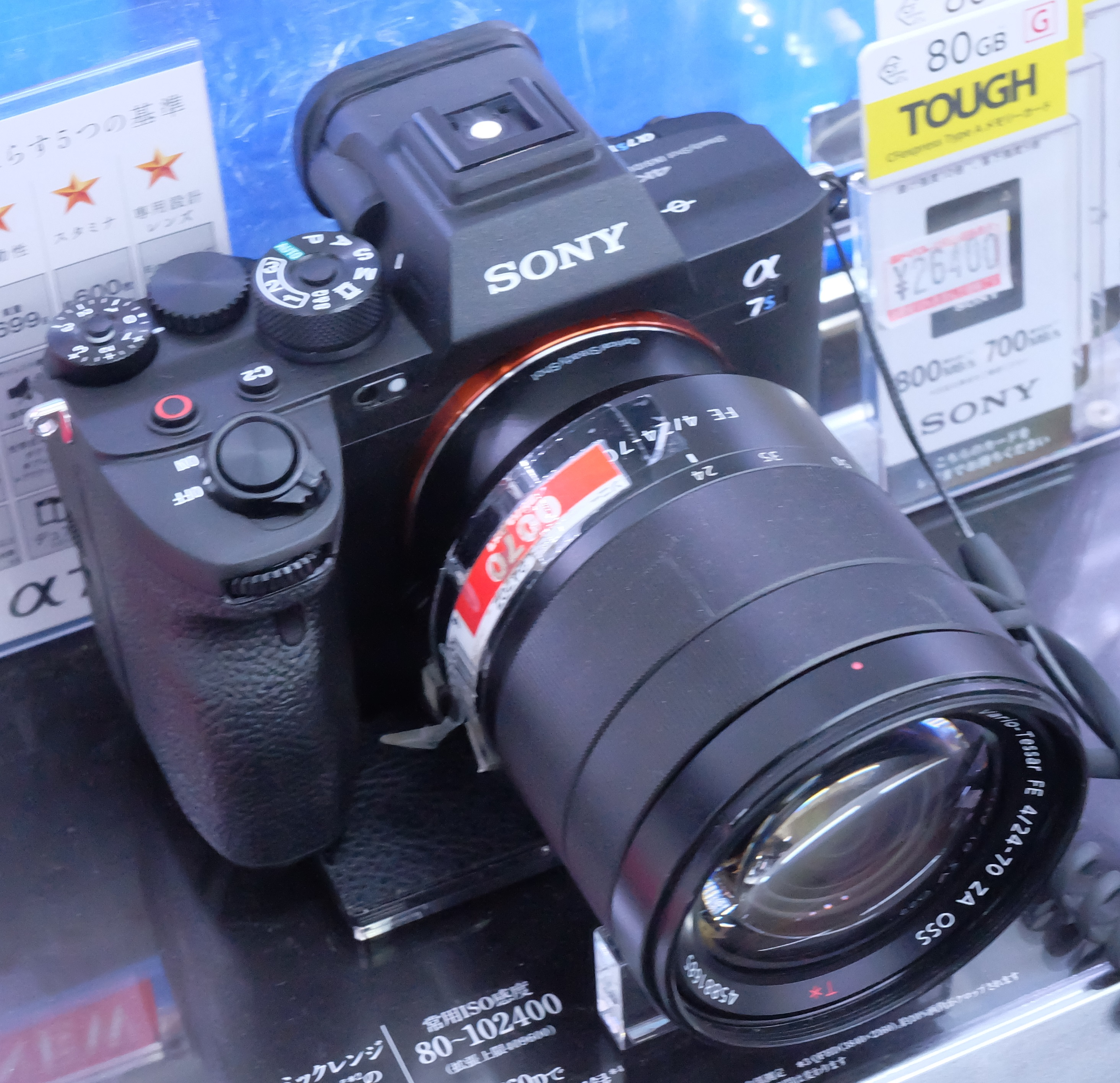

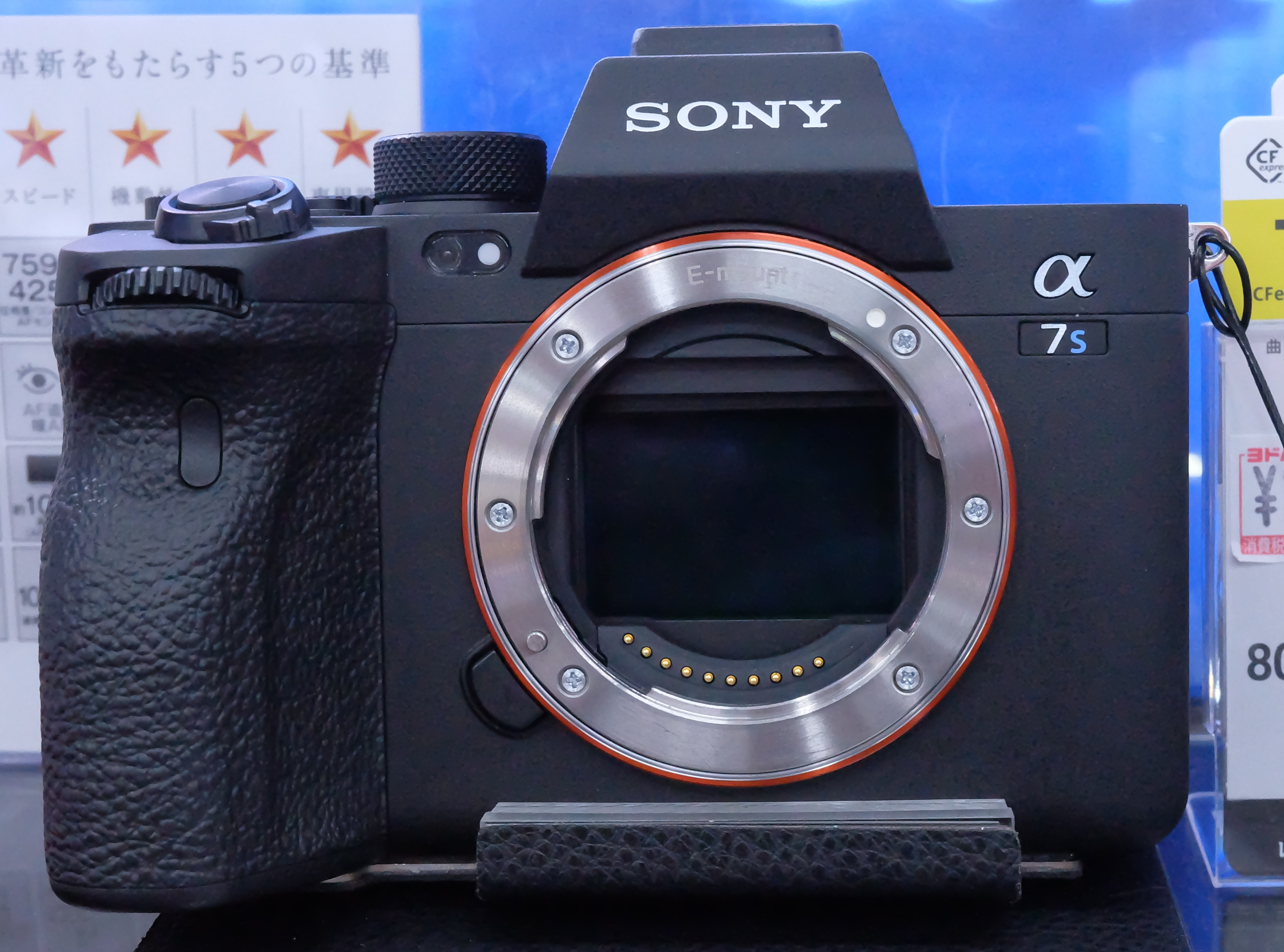

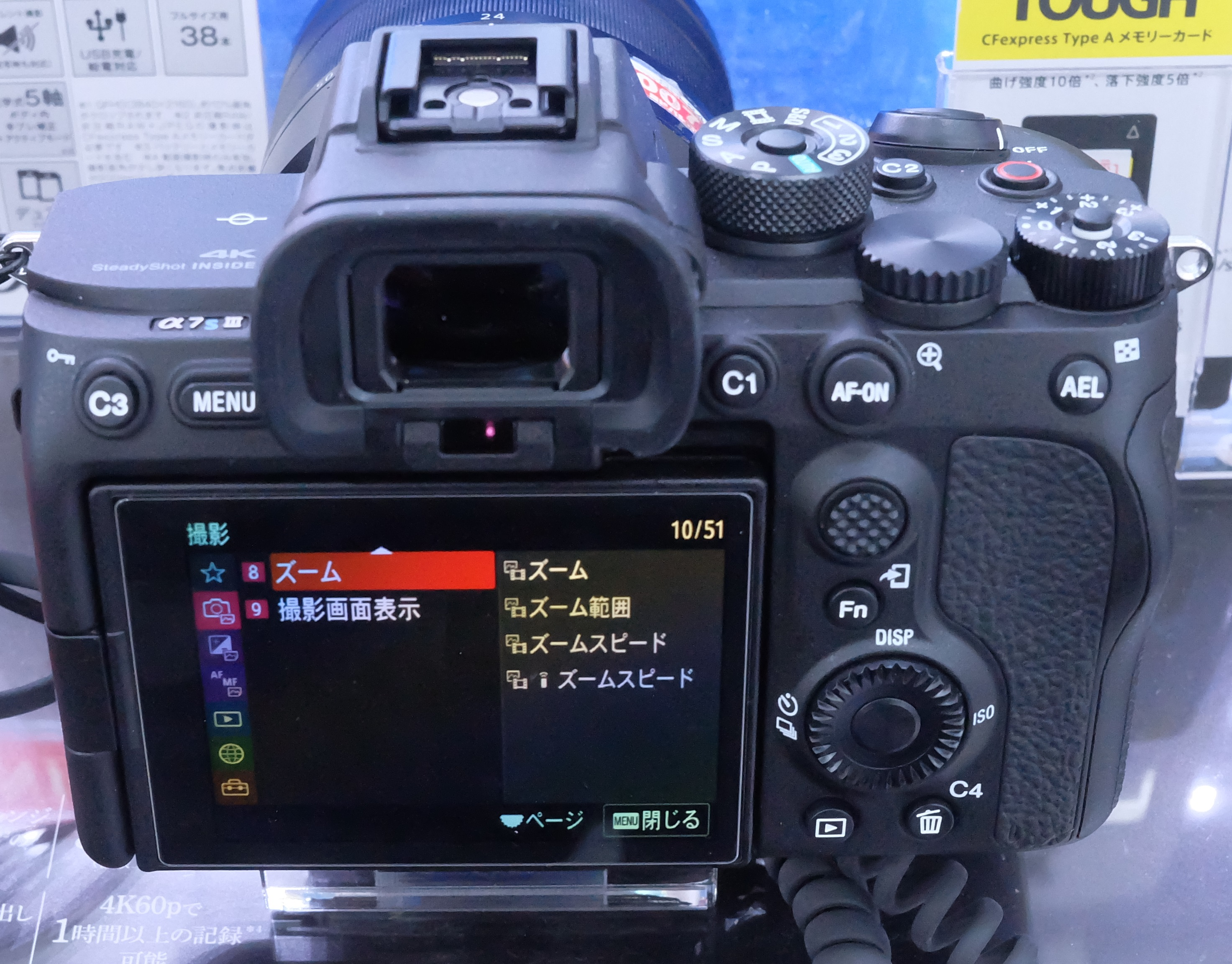

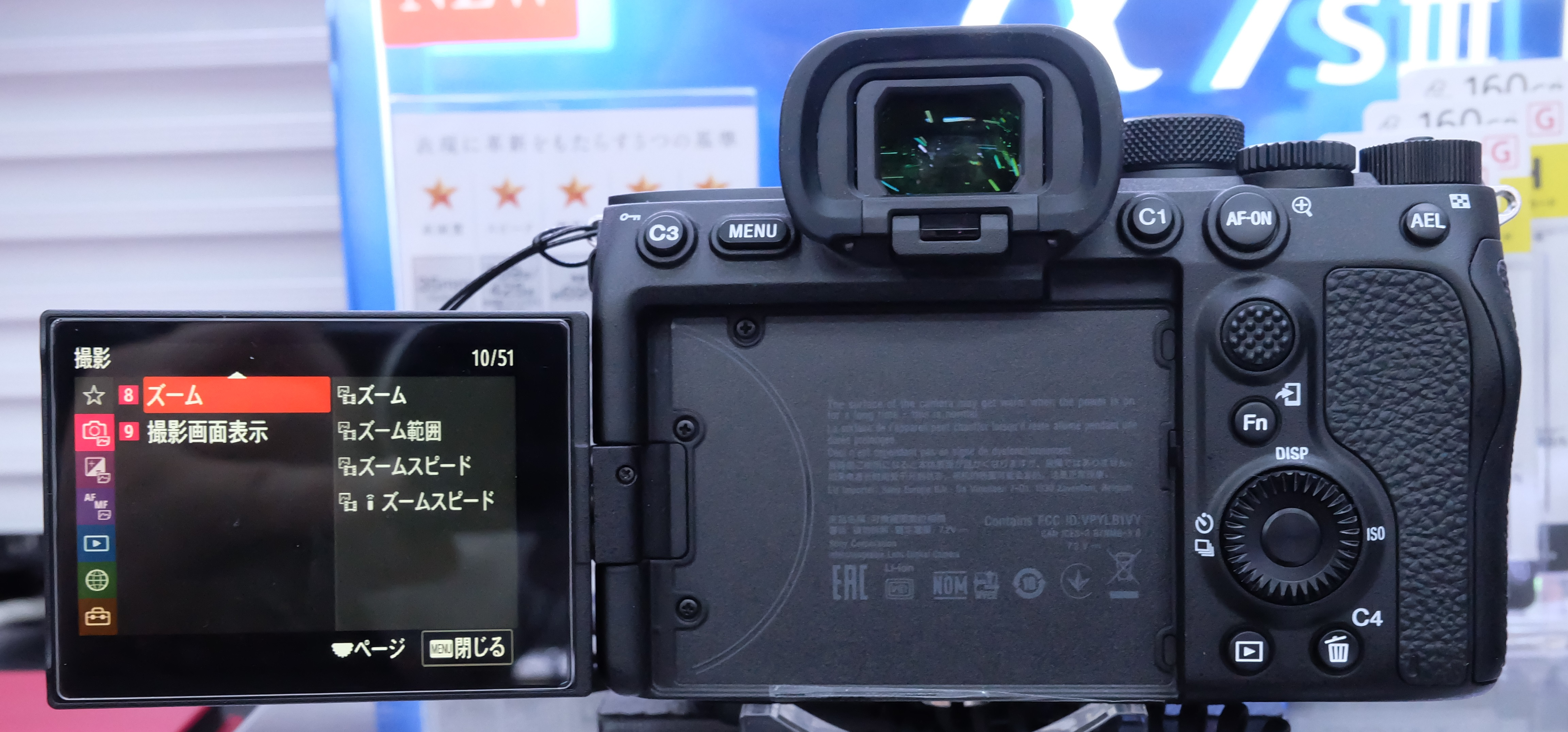

== See also ==
- Comparison of Sony α7 cameras
- List of Sony E-mount cameras
- Sony α7SII
- Sony FX3

Family	Level	Format	'10	2011		2012	2013	2014	2015	2016	2017	2018	2019	2020	2021	2022	2023	2024	2025	2026
Alpha (α)	Indust	FF																ILX-LR1 ^{●}		
Alpha (α)	Cine line	FF													_{m} FX6 ^{●}					
Alpha (α)	Cine line	FF																		_{m} FX5 ^{AT●}
Alpha (α)	Cine line	FF													_{m} FX3 ^{AT●}					
Alpha (α)	Cine line	FF																		_{m} FX2 ^{AT●}
Alpha (α)	Flag	FF													_{m} α1 ^{FT●}				_{m} α1 II ^{FAT●}	
Alpha (α)	Speed	FF										_{m} α9 ^{FT●}			_{m} α9 II ^{FT●}				_{m} α9 III ^{FAT●}	
Alpha (α)	Sens	FF							_{m} α7S ^{●}	_{m} α7S II ^{F●}					_{m} α7S III ^{AT●}					
Alpha (α)	Hi-Res	FF						_{m} α7R ^{●}		_{m} α7R II ^{F●}		_{m} α7R III ^{FT●}		_{m} α7R IV ^{FT●}			_{m} α7R V ^{FAT●}			_{m} α7R VI ^{FAT●}
Alpha (α)	Basic	FF						_{m} α7 ^{F●}	_{m} α7 II ^{F●}				_{m} α7 III ^{FT●}			_{m} α7 IV ^{AT●}				_{m} α7 V ^{FAT●}
Alpha (α)	Compact	FF																_{m} α7CR ^{AT●}		
Alpha (α)	Compact	FF													_{m} α7C ^{AT●}			_{m} α7C II ^{AT●}		
Alpha (α)	Vlog	FF																_{m} ZV-E1 ^{AT●}		
Alpha (α)	Cine	APS-C															_{m} FX30 ^{AT●}			
Alpha (α)	Adv	APS-C			_{s} NEX-7 ^{F●}						_{m} α6500 ^{FT●}			_{m} α6600 ^{FT●}				_{m} α6700 ^{AT●}		
Alpha (α)	Mid-range	APS-C				_{m} NEX-6 ^{F●}					_{m} α6300 ^{F●}		_{m} α6400 ^{F+T●}							
Alpha (α)	Mid-range	APS-C						_{m} α6000 ^{F●}						_{m} α6100 ^{FT●}						
Alpha (α)	Vlog	APS-C														_{m} ZV-E10 ^{AT●}			_{m} ZV-E10 II ^{AT●}	
Alpha (α)	Entry-level	APS-C	NEX-5 ^{F●}	NEX-5N ^{FT●}		NEX-5R ^{F+T●}	NEX-5T ^{F+T●}		α5100 ^{F+T●}											
Alpha (α)	Entry-level	APS-C	NEX-3 ^{F●}	NEX-C3 ^{F●}		NEX-F3 ^{F+●}	NEX-3N ^{F+●}	α5000 ^{F+●}												
DSLR-style		APS-C					_{m} α3000 ^{●}		_{m} α3500 ^{●}											
SmartShot		APS-C							QX1 ^{M●}											
CineAlta	Cine line	FF										VENICE				VENICE 2				
CineAlta	Cine line	FF																BURANO		
XDCAM	Cine line	FF												_{m} FX9						
XDCAM	Docu	S35							_{m} FS7		_{m} FS7 II									
XDCAM	Mobile	S35								_{m} FS5			_{m} FS5 II							
NXCAM	Pro	S35		NEX-FS100		NEX-FS700	NEX-FS700R													
NXCAM	APS-C					NEX-EA50														
Handycam	FF					_{m} NEX-VG900														
Handycam	APS-C		_{s} NEX-VG10		_{s} NEX-VG20	_{m} NEX-VG30														
Security		FF									SNC-VB770									
Security		FF									UMC-S3C									
Family	Level	Format																		
Family	Level	Format	'10	2011		2012	2013	2014	2015	2016	2017	2018	2019	2020	2021	2022	2023	2024	2025	2026
