= Sony Alpha 65 =

Digital camera model

Sony α65
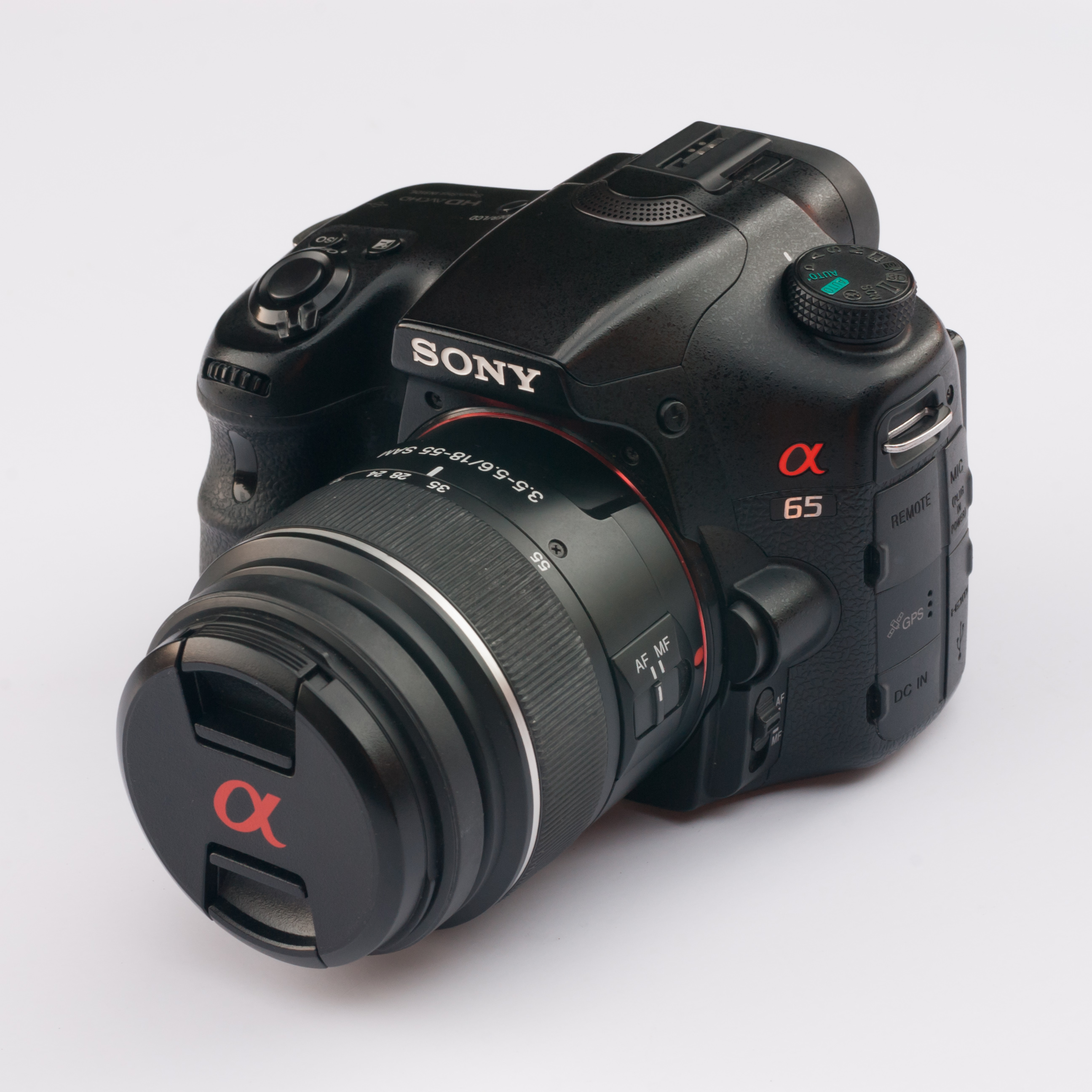

Overview
- Maker: Sony Group
- Type: Digital single-lens translucent camera

Lens
- Lens: Interchangeable, Sony A-mount

Sensor/medium
- Sensor: Exmor APS HD CMOS sensor (23.5 × 15.6mm)
- Maximum resolution: 24.3Mpx
- Film speed: ISO 100 to 16,000 (25,600 with multi-image combination. Expands down to ISO 50)
- Storage media: Memory Stick PRO Duo/Pro-HG Duo/PRO-HG HX Duo media - SD, SDHC and SDXC memory card

Focusing
- Focus modes: Predictive control (AF-C, AF-S, AF-A), focus lock, eye-start AF, manual focus (MF)
- Focus areas: Wide (auto, 15 points), zone, spot, local selectable

Exposure/metering
- Exposure modes: Standard, vivid, portrait, landscape, sunset, black and white, (A) aperture priority, (P) program mode, (S) shutter priority, (M) manual mode
- Exposure metering: Advanced 1200-zone evaluative metering, multi segment, center weighted, spot

Flash
- Flash: Built-in, pop-up auto, auto, fill-flash, slow Sync., rear Sync., red-eye reduction (on/off selectable for autoflash and fill-flash mode), wireless, off, ADI flash, pre-flash TTL, manual flash
- Flash bracketing: 1/3, 1/2, 2/3EV steps for 3 frames

Shutter
- Shutter: Electronically-controlled, vertical-traverse, focal-plane shutter, wireless
- Shutter speed range: 1/4000 to 30s, bulb
- Continuous shooting: 24.3Mpx burst mode continuous shooting, Hi: 8fps and Lo: 3fps

Viewfinder
- Viewfinder: .5in (13mm) TruFinder XGA OLED Electronic View Finder with 2,359,296 dots

Image processing
- White balance: Auto, daylight, shade, cloudy, incandescent, fluorescent (warm white, cool white, day white, daylight), flash, setting the color temperature, color filter, custom

General
- LCD screen: 3in (76.2mm) TFT Xtra Fine LCD with TruBlack technology and 921,600 dots
- Battery: InfoLITHIUM NP-FM500H
- Dimensions: Width: 132.1mm Height: 97.5mm Depth: 80.7mm
- Weight: Approx. 1lb 3.1oz (543g) (excl battery, lens & media) Approx. 1lb 5.9oz (622g) (w/battery & media)
- Made in: Thailand

Announced by Sony on August 24, 2011, and launched alongside its brother the Sony Alpha 77, the Sony Alpha 65 is the top-tier for Sony's midrange Alpha SLT camera line.

The Sony Alpha 65 does not have a direct predecessor like the Sony Alpha 77 but it is still considered a replacement for the Sony Alpha 700 with less high-end specifications compared to its siblings. The A65 lacks the A77's magnesium alloy construction in favor of a polycarbonate resin (plastic) resulting in a lighter frame and slightly smaller dimensions and lacking weather-proofing capability. The A65 uses the USB 2.0 transfer interface of 480 Mbit/s, has HDMI type C for connectivity and remote capabilities using the RM-S1 accessory.

The camera entered the market with its own tier entry into the range, with features such as a 24.3Mpx APS-C HD CMOS sensor using a single-lens translucent mirror and features full HD 1080p recording capabilities using H.264 compression. It hosts a variable burst-shooting mode up to 10fps, stereo audio recording capabilities and like others in the Sony Alpha range it has high sensitivity with ISO 100 to 16000, several noise reduction features, 8 white balance presets including custom balance and exposure control systems. The battery capacity is rated for 510 shots using the electronic viewfinder or 560 shots using the LCD. The capture format for images in raw format uses the .ARW extension, Sony's extension for raw.

The rear panel has the same layout as the Sony Alpha 55 and whilst the LCD hosts a 4:3 aspect ratio compared to the A55's 16:9 it has the same resolution and adjustability. With a few minor layout changes one easily noted oddity is the reversal direction of the power switch compared with the A55 believed to result in an easier operation.

== Model variants ==
Model variants of the Alpha 65 camera body:

- SLT-A65V with GPS.
- SLT-A65 without GPS (depending on country).

Depending on country/market, the Alpha 65 camera is also available in different kits:

- SLT-A65VK (A65V+ 18–55 mm lens).
- SLT-A65VL (A65V+ 18–55 mm MK2 lens).
- SLT-A65VM (A65V+ 18–135 mm lens).

== Features ==
=== Image features ===
- 23.5 × 15.6mm Exmor APS-C HD CMOS sensor.
- 24.3 Mpx (effective), 24.7 Mpx (total) image size.
- Updated BIONZ Image Processor.
- 2nd generation Translucent Mirror Technology.
- Multi-frame Noise Reduction.
- Native 3:2 and 16:9 aspect ratios.
- 1.4x and 2x digital zoom.

=== Focus system ===
- TTL phase-detection AF.
- 15-point autofocus sensors with 3 cross type sensors.
- -1 to 18 exposure value focus sensitivity range (ISO 100 equivalent with F2.8 lens attachment).
- Continuous (AF-C), single (AF-S), auto (AF-A) and manual (MF) focus options.
- Object tracking and micro adjustment AF with focus lock.

=== Exposure and metering ===
- 1200 Zone exposure metering.
- -2 to 17 exposure value metering sensitivity range (ISO 100 equivalent with F1.4 lens attachment).
- Multi segment, center weighted and spot metering.
- ±3.0 exposure value compensation (1/3 EV steps).
- ISO 100 to 16,000 (25,600 with multi-image combination).

=== Shutter ===
- 24.3Mpx burst mode continuous shooting, Hi: 8fps and Lo: 3fps.
- 1/4000 to 30s (and Bulb) shutter speed range.
- Shutter rated for 100,000 actuations.

=== LCD monitor and viewfinder ===
- .5in (13mm) TruFinder XGA OLED electronic viewfinder with 2,359,296 dots resolution with 1.09x magnification and full 100% frame coverage.
- 3in (76.2mm) TruBlack XtraFine LCD screen with 921,600 dots resolution with pull-out three-hinge tilt/swivel functionality and full 100% frame coverage.
- Adjustable LCD angle: Downward 180°, rotation angle: Leftward 270° from the position in which the LCD monitor is facing forward.
- Histogram display, graphic display, digital level gauge, shooting data display, simple display, grid line and shooting information for viewfinder display options.
- 5.9x and 11.7x focus magnification.
- Live View with full-time Phase Detection AF.

=== Ergonomics and functions ===
- Dual anti-dust sensor cleaning system.
- SteadyShot INSIDE, in-body image stabilization system.
- D-Range Optimiser (5 levels and Auto).
- Stereo microphone and external mic socket.
- Built in GPS (SLT-A65V model only).
- 3D Sweep Panorama.

=== Video ===
- AVCHD 2.0 Full 1080p HD recording at 60p/28Mbit/s/(PS), 60i/24Mbit/s/(FX), 60i/17Mbit/s/(FH), 24p/24Mbit/s/(FX) or 24p/17Mbit/s/(bpsFH).
- MPEG-4 recording at 1440 × 1080 (30fps/12Mbit/s) and VGA 640 × 480 (30fps/3Mbit/s).
- MPEG-4 AVC (H.264) video compression.
- Dolby Digital (AC-3) and MPEG-4 AAC-LC audio recording formats.

== Firmware updates ==
On 5 February 2013, Sony released a new firmware V1.07, with the following enhancements:

- Added support for Sony Alpha Lenses (with automatic compensation compliancy):
  - SAL-100M28, SAL-50M28, SAL-85F28, SAL-18200, SAL-20F28 and SAL-28F28.

Level	Sensor	2004	2005	2006	2007	2008	2009	2010	2011		2012	2013	2014	2015	2016	2017	2018	2019	2020
Professional	Full frame						α900					α99				α99 II			
Professional	Full frame							α850											
High-end	APS-C		DG-7D			α700				α77				α77 II					
Midrange	APS-C									α65					α68				
Upper-entry	APS-C								α55		α57								
Upper-entry	APS-C				α100			α550 ^{F}	α580				α58						
Upper-entry	APS-C		DG-5D					α500	α560										
Upper-entry	APS-C							α450											
Entry-level	APS-C								α33	α35	α37								
Entry-level	APS-C					α350 ^{F}		α380	α390										
Entry-level	APS-C					α300		α330											
Entry-level	APS-C					α200		α230	α290										
Early models	Minolta 7000 with SB-70/SB-70S (1986) · Minolta 9000 with SB-90/SB-90S (1986) (Still video SLRs); Minolta MS-C1100 (1992) · Minolta RD-175 (1995)																		
Level	Sensor																		
Level	Sensor	2004	2005	2006	2007	2008	2009	2010	2011		2012	2013	2014	2015	2016	2017	2018	2019	2020
