= Sony Alpha 58 =

Digital camera

Sony α58
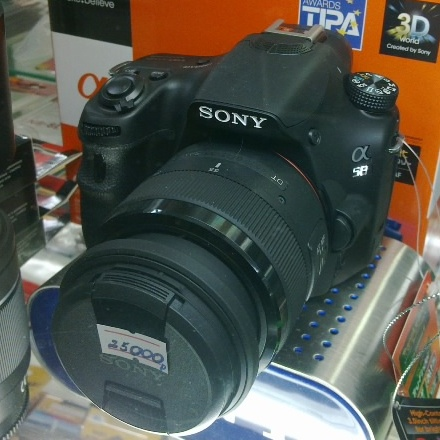
- Sony α58 with 18-55mm Kit Lens (SAL1855II)

Overview
- Maker: Sony
- Type: Sony SLT camera
- Released: April 2013
- Intro price: US$600 / £450 (SAL18-55II kit), £600 (Twin Lens Kit - 18-55II & 55-200 SAM)

Lens
- Lens mount: Sony / Minolta A mount
- Lens: Interchangeable

Sensor/medium
- Sensor: Sony Exmor APS HD CMOS
- Sensor type: CMOS
- Sensor size: APS-C (23.2 x 15.4 mm)
- Sensor maker: Sony
- Maximum resolution: 5456 x 3632 (20.1 megapixels)
- Film speed: ISO 100-16000 (25600 Max w/ Multi-Frame NR)
- Recording medium: SD, SDHC, SDXC (SD, 3.01, does not use UHS bus) Memory Stick PRO Duo™, Memory Stick PRO-HG Duo™, Memory Stick XC-HG Duo™

Focusing
- Focus modes: AF-S (Single), AF-A (Auto), AF-C (Continuous)
- Focus areas: 15 (3 cross-type), -1-18 EV (@ ISO 100 Equiv.)

Exposure/metering
- Exposure bracketing: 0.3 EV, 0.7 EV, 1.0 EV, 2.0 EV, 3.0 EV steps, 3 frames
- Exposure modes: Auto, Scene Selection, Program, Shutter/Aperture Priority, Manual
- Exposure metering: 1200-zone Evaluative, on sensor
- Metering modes: Multi (Evaluative), Spot, Centre-Weighted

Flash
- Flash: ADI / Pre-TTL, GN 10m/33' @ ISO 100
- Flash exposure compensation: +/- 2.0EV (1/3EV steps)
- Flash synchronization: 1/160 Sync

Shutter
- Frame rate: 8fps (1.4x Crop, Locked AE, 5MP) - 16 JPEG Buffer 5fps (20MP) - 7/6/5 frame Buffer (JPEG/RAW/RAW+JPEG)
- Shutter: Mechanical
- Shutter speed range: 30s - 1/4000s

Viewfinder
- Electronic viewfinder: 800x600 (1.44-million dot) SVGA OLED, 0.46"
- Viewfinder magnification: 0.88x
- Frame coverage: 100%

Image processing
- Image processor: BIONZ
- White balance: 2500-9900K (G7-M7,15-step) (A7-B7,15-step) AWB/Daylight/Shade/Cloudy/Incandescent/Fluorescent/Flash
- WB bracketing: 3 frames, selectable 2 types

General
- Video recording: 1920x1080 (25p/50i) 24/17Mbps (PAL), 24p/60i (NTSC), AVCHD. 1440x1080 (30p/25p), 12Mbps 640x480, 25p (VGA)
- LCD screen: 2.7" 460,800 dot TFT Tilting LCD
- Battery: NP-FM500H
- AV port: HDMI Type D (Mini HDMI) 3.5mm Microphone Input
- Data port: Micro-USB 2.0 (Multi)
- Body features: In body image stabilisation (2.5-4.5 Stops, "Steadyshot")
- Dimensions: 128.6×95.5×77.7 mm (5.06×3.76×3.06 in)
- Weight: 492 g (17.4 oz) (body only)

Chronology
- Replaced: Sony Alpha 55
- Predecessor: Sony Alpha 57

References
- https://www.dailycameranews.com/2013/02/sony-slt-a58-alpha-58-announced-specification-and-release-date/ https://www.sony.co.uk/electronics/support/a-mount-body-slt-a50-series/slt-a58/specifications https://amateurphotographer.com/review/sony-alpha-58-review/

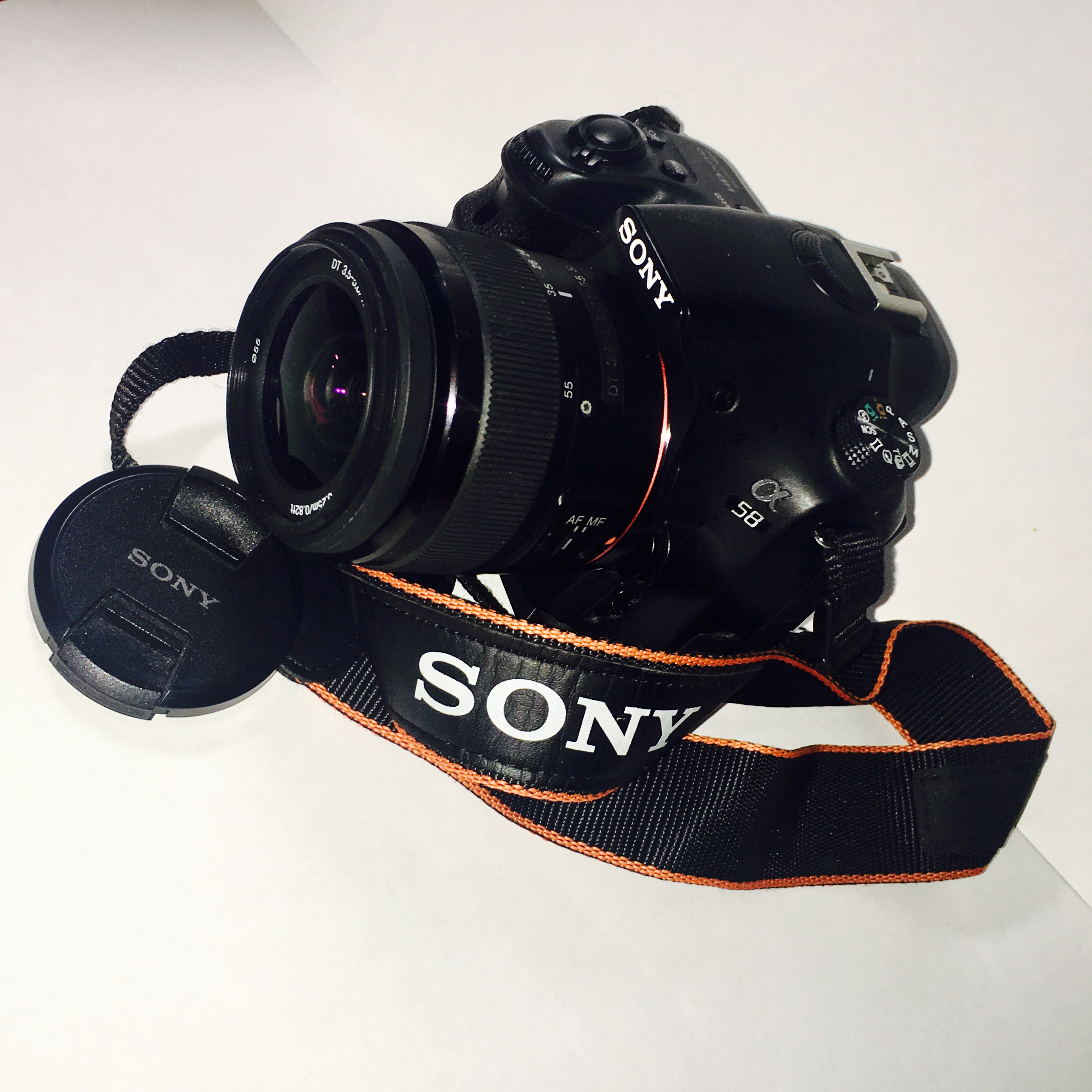
Sony SLT-A58 with SAL18-55II lens

The Sony α58, Sony Alpha 58 also known as Sony A58 (model name SLT-A58) is a mid-range digital camera from Sony's Alpha SLT camera line, introduced in 2013. It replaced the Sony Alpha 37 and Sony Alpha 57. It launched at US$600/£450 for the body with the SAL18-55II kit lens, or £600 with the SAL18-55II and SAL55-200 SAM lenses.

== Specifications ==
The Alpha 58 camera features 20.1 megapixels, 5fps burst shooting (8fps in 5MP 1.4x crop mode), 1080/60i and 1080/24p video in both AVCHD and MPEG 4 formats, 15-point phase-detection autofocus system, ISO range of 100–16000, APS-C sized CMOS sensor, a tiltable 2.7" LCD screen, an SVGA (800x600) OLED EVF EVF with 100% coverage, a built in flash, an ISO 518-compatible hotshoe, a stereo microphone for video shooting and other features. Audio recording levels are automatic.

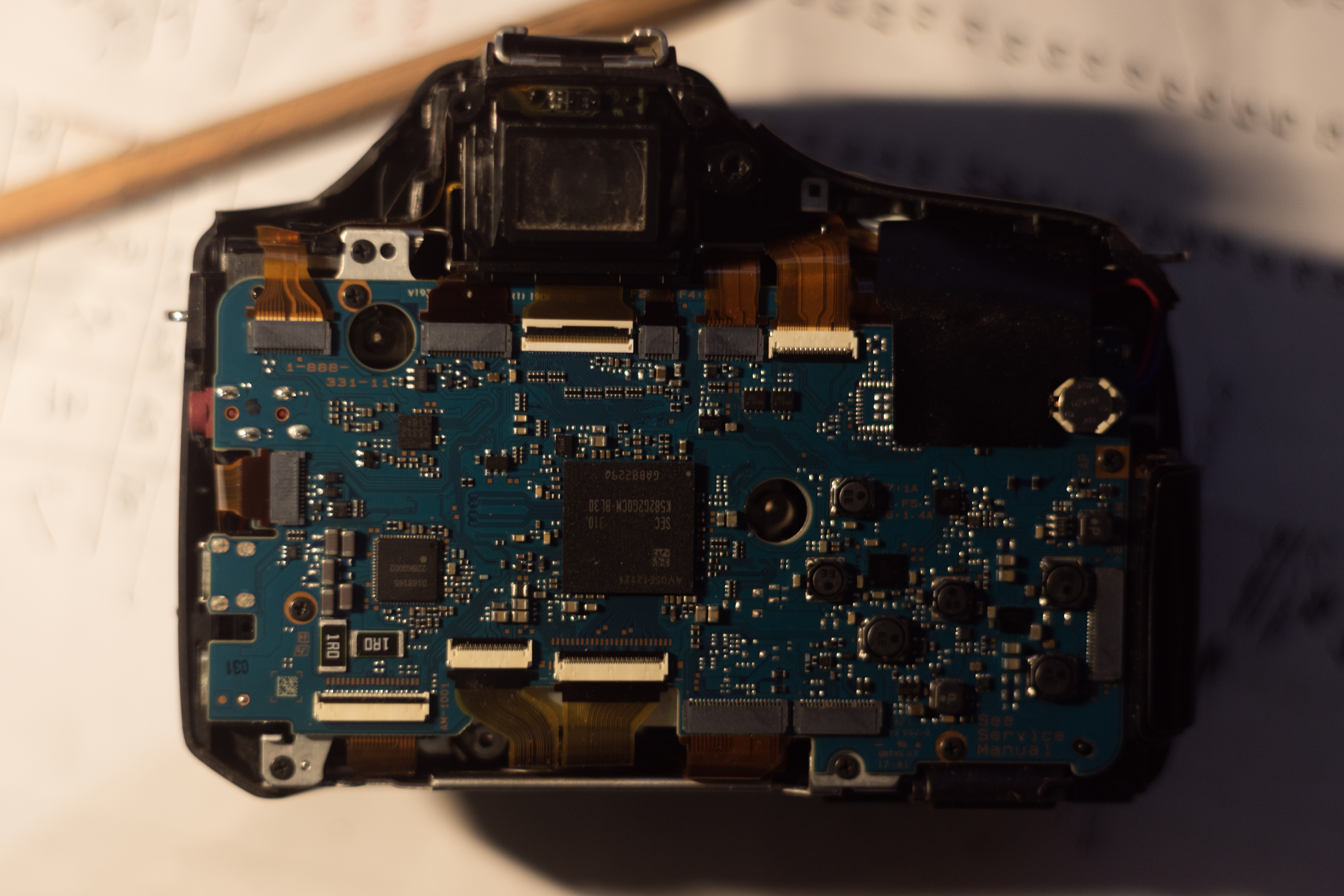
Sony SLT A58 , back cover removed

The auto-focus system provides eight modes: Phase Detect, Multi-area, Selective single-point, Tracking, Single, Continuous, Face Detection, Live View.

=== Video ===
- AVCHD recording at 1920 x 1080 (50i (1080i) @ 24 Mbit/s, 50i (1080i) @ 17 Mbit/s, 25p (1080p) @ 24 Mbit/s, 25p (1080p)) @ 17 Mbit/s (European models)

or 1920 x 1080 (60i (1080i) @ 24 Mbit/s, 60i (1080i) @ 17 Mbit/s, 24p (1080p) @ 24 Mbit/s, 24p (1080p)) @ 17 Mbit/s (USA models)

- MPEG-4 recording at 1440 x 1080 (Approx.25fps @ 12 Mbit/s (Average bit-rate))

The interlaced video modes store progressively recorded frames at half the stated field rate. Unlike its predecessor, the Sony Alpha 57, the Alpha 58 does not offer 50p/60p video modes. Also unlike previous generation SLT cameras including the A57, A65, and A77, the A58 does not crop the sensor width when video Steady Shot is turned off.

== Features ==
Infrared remote control does not exist as it did with its predecessor, the a57. Remote control by computer via USB is available. Captured images are immediately transferred to a computer and no memory card is involved in this case. Powering the device via optional ACDC adaptor is available. It has half-transparent mirror which is used for auto-focus function only. Some users have removed this semi-transparent mirror. Auto-focus function is lost in this case but sensor receives more light.

== Sources ==
Level	Sensor	2004	2005	2006	2007	2008	2009	2010	2011		2012	2013	2014	2015	2016	2017	2018	2019	2020
Professional	Full frame						α900					α99				α99 II			
Professional	Full frame							α850											
High-end	APS-C		DG-7D			α700				α77				α77 II					
Midrange	APS-C									α65					α68				
Upper-entry	APS-C								α55		α57								
Upper-entry	APS-C				α100			α550 ^{F}	α580				α58						
Upper-entry	APS-C		DG-5D					α500	α560										
Upper-entry	APS-C							α450											
Entry-level	APS-C								α33	α35	α37								
Entry-level	APS-C					α350 ^{F}		α380	α390										
Entry-level	APS-C					α300		α330											
Entry-level	APS-C					α200		α230	α290										
Early models	Minolta 7000 with SB-70/SB-70S (1986) · Minolta 9000 with SB-90/SB-90S (1986) (Still video SLRs); Minolta MS-C1100 (1992) · Minolta RD-175 (1995)																		
Level	Sensor																		
Level	Sensor	2004	2005	2006	2007	2008	2009	2010	2011		2012	2013	2014	2015	2016	2017	2018	2019	2020
