= Beercan =

Beercan or Beer can may refer to:

- "Beercan" (song), a 1994 song by Beck
- Beer can, a beverage can for beer
- Minolta AF 70-210mm f/4 lens or beercan, a photographic lens
- "Beer Can", a song by The Reklaws from the 2020 album Sophomore Slump
