= Sony Alpha 99 =

Digital camera model

Sony α99
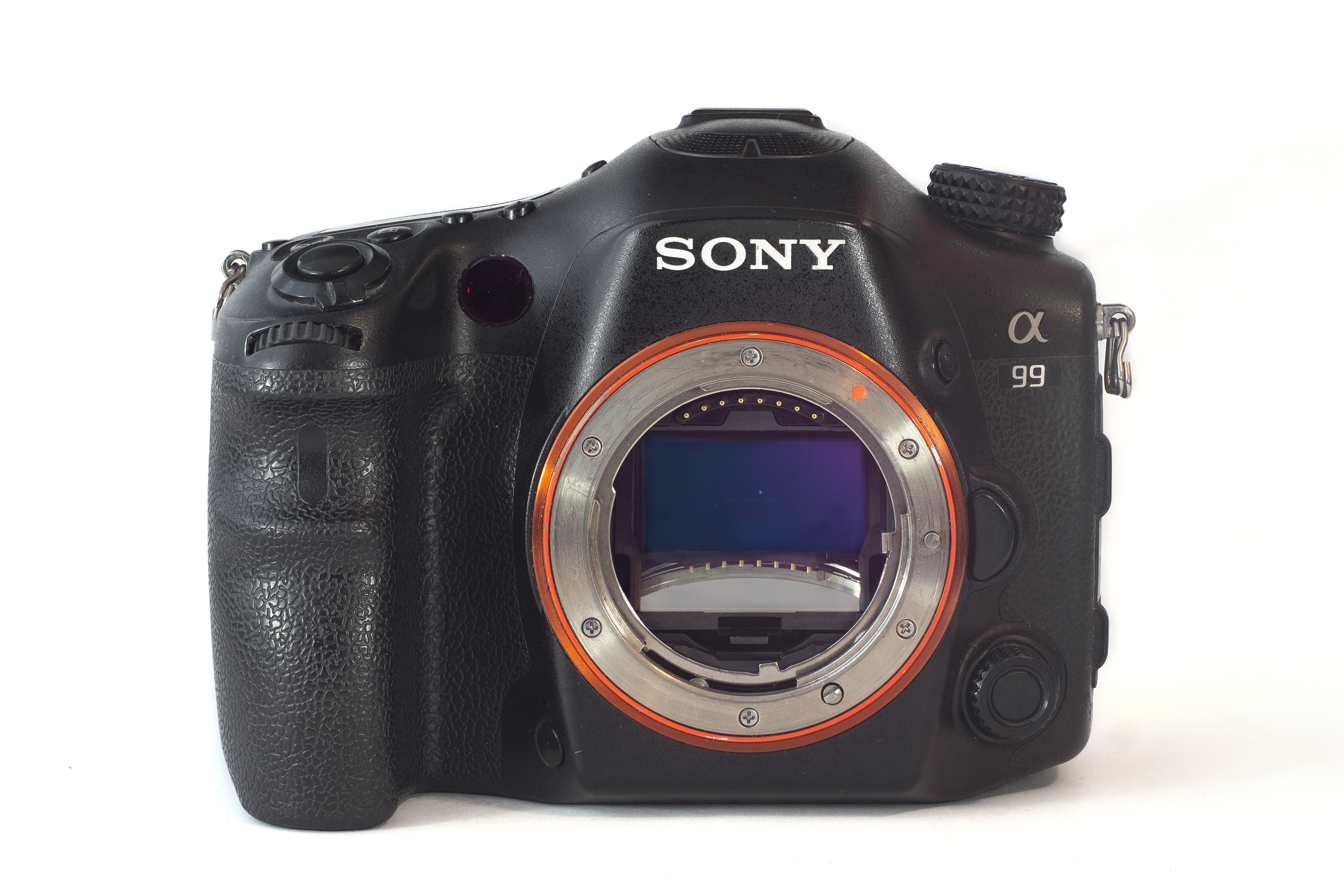

Overview
- Type: Digital single-lens translucent camera

Lens
- Lens: Sony mount; compatible with Minolta A-type bayonet mount.

Sensor/medium
- Sensor: 35.6 mm × 23.8 mm Exmor CMOS sensor
- Maximum resolution: 6000 x 4000 pixel (24.3 megapixels)
- Storage media: Memory stick PRO Duo™/Pro-HG Duo™ media; SD, SDHC and SDXC memory card

Focusing
- Focus modes: Predictive control(AF-A, AF-C), Depth Map Assist AF (AF-D), Focus Lock, Eye-start AF
- Focus areas: Wide (auto,19 points)/Zone/Spot/Local selectable

Exposure/metering
- Exposure modes: Mode: Auto, Program AE (P), Aperture priority (A), Shutter priority (S), Manual (M), Scene Selection, Sweep Panorama, Tele-zoom Continuous Advance Priority AE, Movie
- Exposure metering: 1200-zone evaluative metering
- Metering modes: Multi-segment, center-weighted, spot

Shutter
- Shutter: Electronically controlled, vertical-traverse, focal-plane type
- Shutter speed range: Still images: 1/8000 to 30 sec, Bulb
- Continuous shooting: 10fps

Viewfinder
- Viewfinder: 1.3 cm electronic viewfinder with 2,359k dots, 100% field of view, 0.71 x magnification

General
- LCD screen: 3.0", 1,228,800 dots
- Battery: NP-FM500H lithium-ion rechargeable battery (1650 mAh)
- Weight: 733 g (25.9 oz), body only

The Sony Alpha 99 was announced by Sony on September 12, 2012. It was the flagship Sony DSLR camera and of the Sony Alpha SLT line until late 2016 when it was replaced by the Sony α99 II.

It features the 24.3MP 35mm full-frame Exmor APS HD CMOS sensor, with the normal sensor range of ISO 100–3200. The selectable sensitivity is up to ISO 25600, which makes this camera able to capture still images in low-light environments. This camera can also combine six images together, to generate a single image with two additional steps of ISO sensitivity. This is also the first Sony Alpha camera to use the new Sony "Mult-Interface" shoe which is a standard ISO shoe with proprietary contacts at the front of the shoe. This allows use of standard ISO hotshoe accessories without the need for adapters as in previous Alpha models. The camera ships with an adapter to allow use of older Minolta-style hot-shoe accessories.

Like Sony's APS-c flagship, α77, the α99 has the ability to record Full HD 1080 video with up to 60p frame rate. In markets outside China, this camera also has built-in GPS that allows recording of position information into the photo. The α99 also uses a three-way tiltable LCD, as used on α77, this feature allows the photographer to view the LCD from any angle. Alongside the lens mount Sony has replaced the traditional autofocus mode selection dial with a "Silent Multi-Controller" which is a customizable dial with silent detents and a central button used for confirmation. The dial's function can be brought up with a press of the central button and then changed using the dial silently during movie or still recording. The dial's functions can also be changed on the fly by long-pressing the button and then selecting whichever function is desired.

For flexibility Sony α99 allows users to use Sony's crop APS-C DT lenses and consequently automatically cropping the image to the smaller frame.

An updated version, the Sony α99 II, was announced at Photokina in September 2016.

== Model variants ==
Model variants of the Alpha 99 camera body:

- SLT-A99V with GPS.
- SLT-A99 without GPS (depending on country).

== Hasselblad HV ==
In February 2014, Hasselblad introduced a restyled Sony A99 as Hasselblad HV. According to the company's press-release, their version of A99 is "tough as nails", featuring more robust construction than the original.

== Features ==
=== Image and autofocus ===
- 24.3MP 35mm full-frame Exmor APS HD CMOS sensor.
- Updated BIONZ image processor.
- A dual AF System (19+ 102 points, 11 cross type).
- 1200-zone evaluative exposure metering.
- TTL phase-detection auto focusing.

=== ISO ===
- ISO sensitivity 100–25600.

=== Ergonomy ===
- TruFinder XGA OLED Electronic viewfinder with 100% frame coverage.

== Performance ==
In the DxOMark Overall Sensor Score test, which is based on all characteristics of a camera sensor, the Sony Alpha 99 scores 89 points, which equals the score of the Nikon D4 and the Phase One P65 Plus medium format camera, with the Nikon D800E, D800 and D600 being the only digital SLRs that get a higher score. Therefore, as of September 2013, the Sony Alpha 99 scores higher than all DSLRs from Canon and all DSLRs except those listed here from Nikon, including their professional models.

== See also ==
- Sony α99 II (ILCA-99M2) (successor model)

Level	Sensor	2004	2005	2006	2007	2008	2009	2010	2011		2012	2013	2014	2015	2016	2017	2018	2019	2020
Professional	Full frame						α900					α99				α99 II			
Professional	Full frame							α850											
High-end	APS-C		DG-7D			α700				α77				α77 II					
Midrange	APS-C									α65					α68				
Upper-entry	APS-C								α55		α57								
Upper-entry	APS-C				α100			α550 ^{F}	α580				α58						
Upper-entry	APS-C		DG-5D					α500	α560										
Upper-entry	APS-C							α450											
Entry-level	APS-C								α33	α35	α37								
Entry-level	APS-C					α350 ^{F}		α380	α390										
Entry-level	APS-C					α300		α330											
Entry-level	APS-C					α200		α230	α290										
Early models	Minolta 7000 with SB-70/SB-70S (1986) · Minolta 9000 with SB-90/SB-90S (1986) (Still video SLRs); Minolta MS-C1100 (1992) · Minolta RD-175 (1995)																		
Level	Sensor																		
Level	Sensor	2004	2005	2006	2007	2008	2009	2010	2011		2012	2013	2014	2015	2016	2017	2018	2019	2020
