= Sony Ericsson SO905iCS =

2008 mobile phone model

FOMA SO905iCS
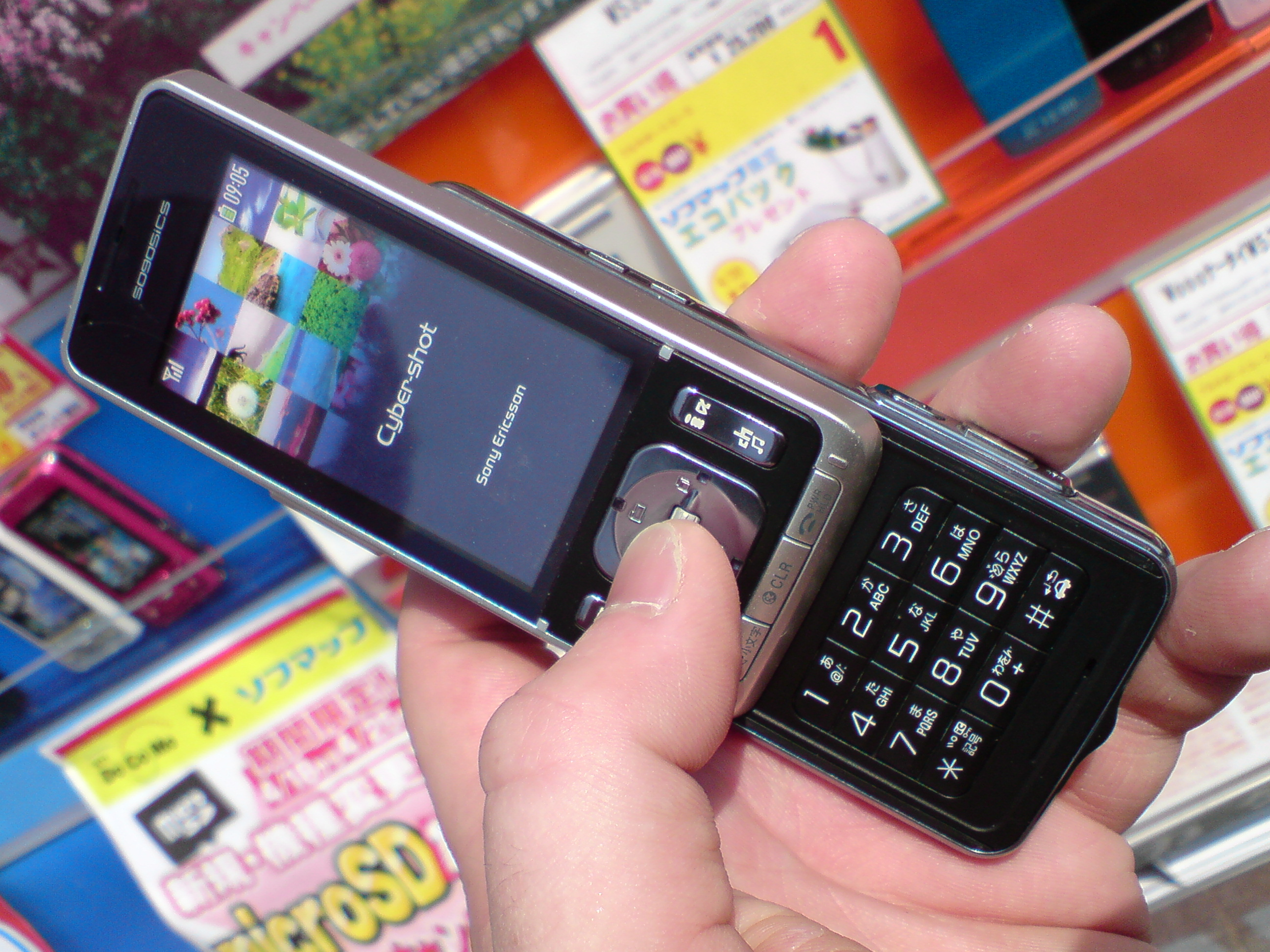
- Brand: NTT Docomo
- Manufacturer: Sony Ericsson
- Type: Feature phone
- Series: FOMA 905i
- First released: February 15, 2008
- Compatible networks: 3G: FOMA (W-CDMA); 2G: GSM (900/1800/1900 MHz); 3G Bands: 800 MHz, 1.7 GHz, 2 GHz
- Form factor: Slider
- Colors: Silver; Pink; White
- Dimensions: 113 mm (4.4 in) H 50 mm (2.0 in) W 24 mm (0.94 in) D
- Weight: 145 g (5.1 oz)
- Operating system: Symbian OS v9.3 + MOAP(S)
- CPU: SH-Mobile G2
- Storage: Approx. 512 MB
- Removable storage: MicroSD (up to 2 GB)
- Rear camera: 5.11 megapixels Exmor CMOS, 3x optical zoom, autofocus, image stabilization, high-brightness LED flash
- Front camera: 0.3 megapixel CMOS
- Display: 2.7 in (69 mm) transmissive TFT LCD, 480 × 864 pixels (Full Wide VGA), 16.77 million colors

The FOMA SO905iCS (FOMA SO905i Camera Style) is a 3G feature phone developed by Sony Ericsson (now Sony Mobile) and released on February 15, 2008 by Japanese telecommunications carrier NTT Docomo.

The SO905iCS was the first mobile phone released in Japan to carry Sony's Cyber-shot digital camera branding.

== Specifications ==
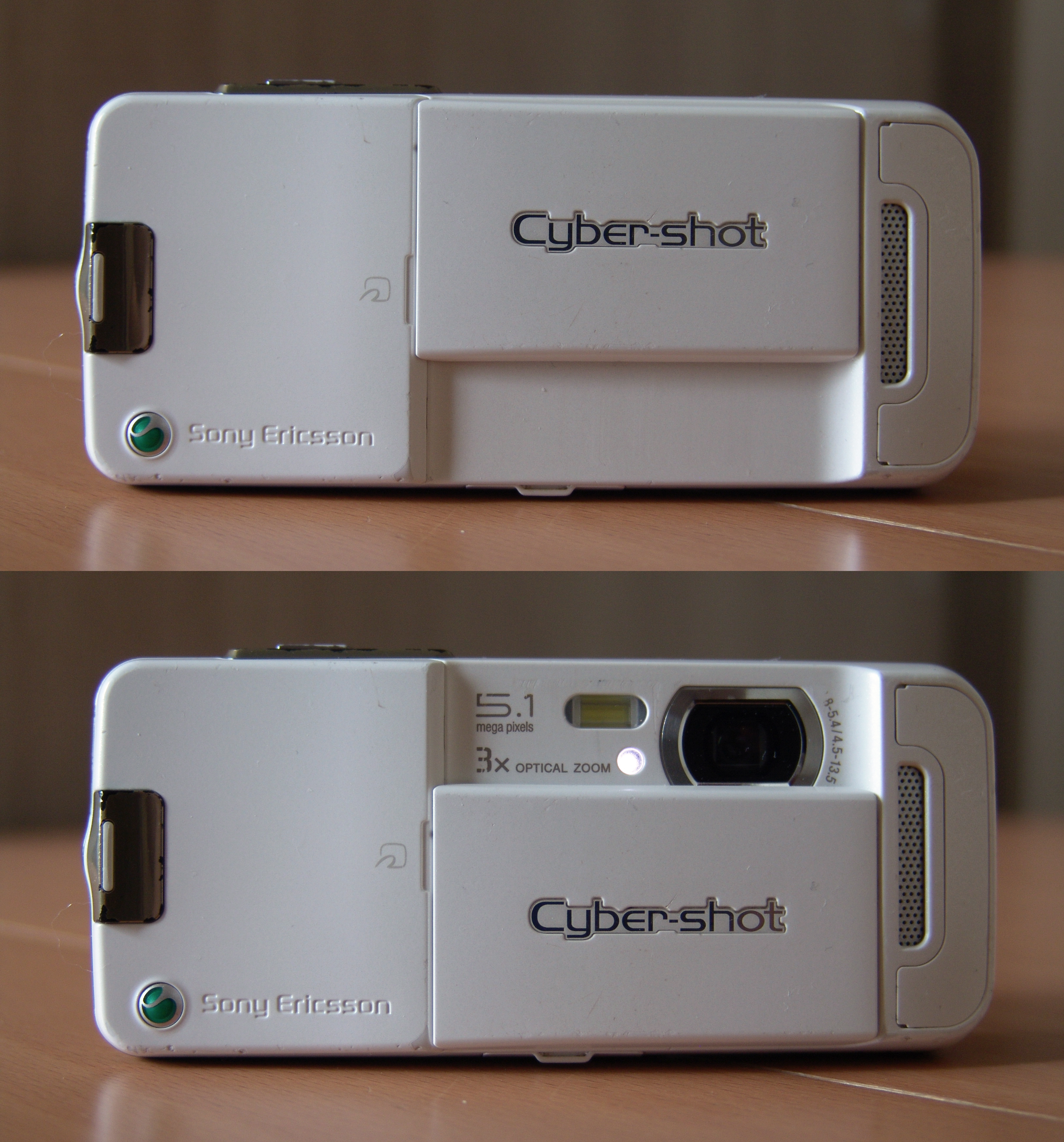
Rear panel view

While similar to au's W53CA (which carried Casio's EXILIM brand) in featuring a 5.11-megapixel camera and a 2.7-inch wide VGA LCD display, the SO905iCS features a slider form factor equipped with full-fledged camera capabilities, including a 3x optical zoom and "Kao Kime Lite" face detection. The "CS" designation in the model name stands for "Camera Style" rather than "Cyber-shot".

The back of the device features a sliding lens cover inspired by the Sony Cyber-shot T series. Sliding the cover open immediately launches the camera application. A prominent "Cyber-shot" logo is engraved on the cover.

The device incorporates a 5.1-megapixel effective Exmor CMOS sensor developed by Sony—similar to the technology used in the α700 digital single-lens reflex camera. It utilizes on-chip column A/D conversion and dual noise reduction to produce low-noise, high-quality images. It also employs an internal folded optics mechanism for its 3x optical zoom, allowing optical magnification without an external extending lens. The phone offers sensitivity up to ISO 1600, image stabilization, a "Smile Shutter Lite" mode that detects smiles automatically, and "Kao Kime Lite" for detecting up to three faces to adjust focus and exposure.

Another key feature of the handset was its streamlined blog posting integration. Rather than manually saving, rotating, and attaching photos to an email draft, the "Blog Post" function prepared the entire upload process automatically upon opening the mail client. At launch, pre-configured compatibility included sites like mixi and eyevio Mobile, with options for manual site entry.

The phone supports GPS functions, including location search using Docomo's "Map Application". GPS location data can be geotagged onto captured photos, which can then be managed on a PC map interface using the bundled "Picture Motion Browser" software.

The primary display is a 2.7-inch Full Wide VGA display utilizing Sony's "RealityMAX" engine derived from BRAVIA television technology, supporting up to 16.77 million colors.

For input navigation, the device features a +JOG dial similar to the SO905i. Text entry utilizes the POBox Pro 2.0 system.

The full web browser offers thumbnail bookmark views and a "PagePilot" overview mode. Unlike the N905iμ, the SO905iCS does not support 1seg digital TV broadcasts, nor does it support voice recognition features found on the F905i or SO905i.

External storage is supported via MicroSD cards up to 2 GB. Internal storage capacity is 512 MB.
