= Sony Alpha 33 =

Sony SLT-A33
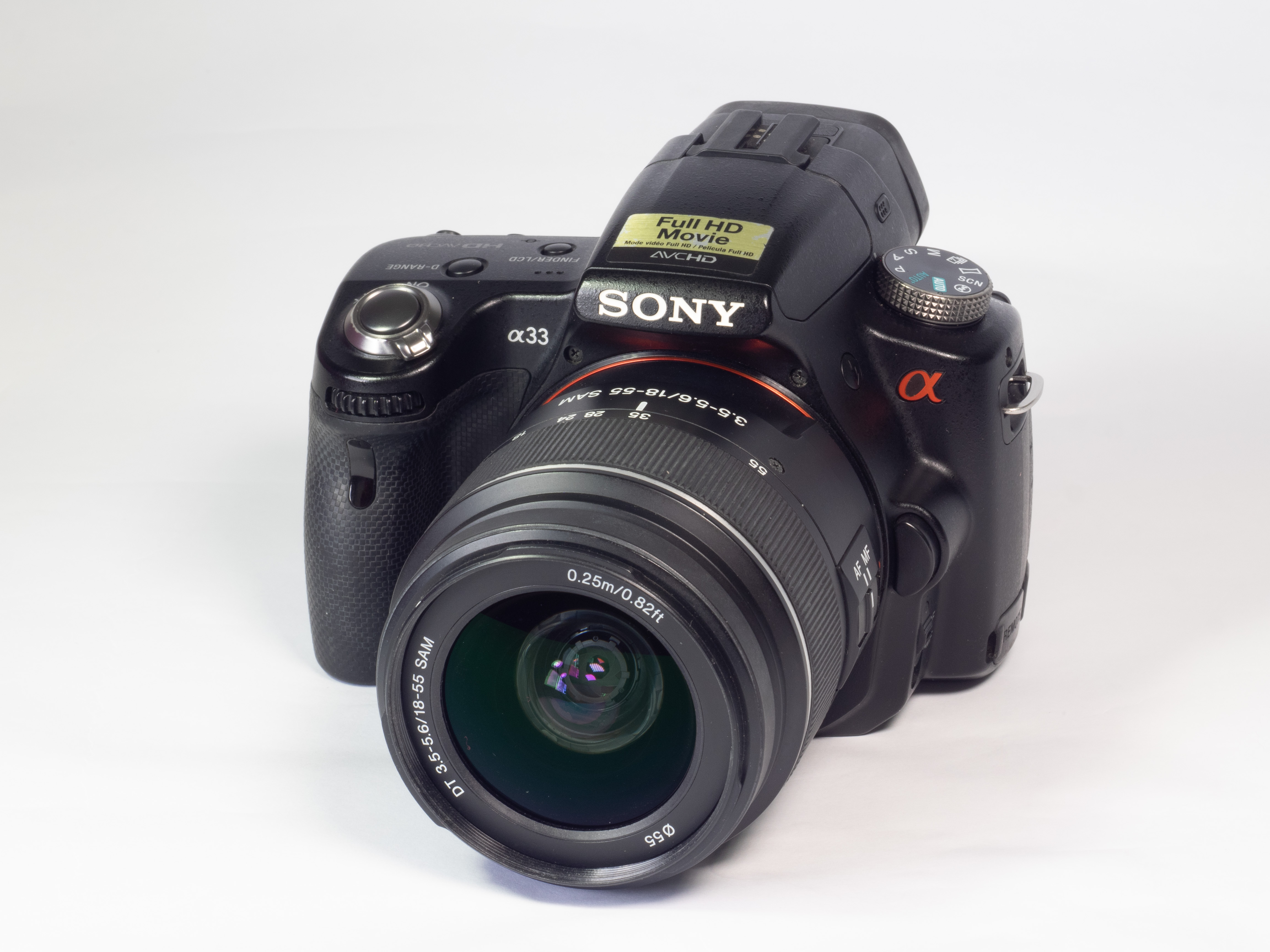

Overview
- Maker: Sony

Sensor/medium
- Sensor type: CMOS
- Sensor size: 23.5 x 15.6mm (APS-C type)
- Maximum resolution: 4592 x 3056 (14 megapixels)
- Film speed: 100-25600
- Recording medium: SD, SDHC, SDXC, Memory Stick Pro Duo or Pro-HG Duo

Focusing
- Focus areas: 15 focus points

Shutter
- Shutter speeds: 1/4000s to 30s
- Continuous shooting: 7 frames per second

Viewfinder
- Viewfinder magnification: 1.1
- Frame coverage: 100%

Image processing
- Image processor: Bionz
- White balance: Yes

General
- LCD screen: 3 inches with 921,000 dots
- Dimensions: 124 x 92 x 85 mm (4.88 x 3.62 x 3.35 inches)
- Weight: 500 g (18 oz) including battery

The Sony α33 or Sony Alpha 33 (model name SLT-A33) is a digital SLT camera announced by Sony on August 24, 2010, at the same time as the Sony Alpha 55. These two cameras are the joint first production DSLT cameras to be announced.

== Lens mount ==
Sony Alpha SLT-a33 uses A-mount lens bayonet.

Level	Sensor	2004	2005	2006	2007	2008	2009	2010	2011		2012	2013	2014	2015	2016	2017	2018	2019	2020
Professional	Full frame						α900					α99				α99 II			
Professional	Full frame							α850											
High-end	APS-C		DG-7D			α700				α77				α77 II					
Midrange	APS-C									α65					α68				
Upper-entry	APS-C								α55		α57								
Upper-entry	APS-C				α100			α550 ^{F}	α580				α58						
Upper-entry	APS-C		DG-5D					α500	α560										
Upper-entry	APS-C							α450											
Entry-level	APS-C								α33	α35	α37								
Entry-level	APS-C					α350 ^{F}		α380	α390										
Entry-level	APS-C					α300		α330											
Entry-level	APS-C					α200		α230	α290										
Early models	Minolta 7000 with SB-70/SB-70S (1986) · Minolta 9000 with SB-90/SB-90S (1986) (Still video SLRs); Minolta MS-C1100 (1992) · Minolta RD-175 (1995)																		
Level	Sensor																		
Level	Sensor	2004	2005	2006	2007	2008	2009	2010	2011		2012	2013	2014	2015	2016	2017	2018	2019	2020
