= Sony Alpha 77 II =

Sony α77 II
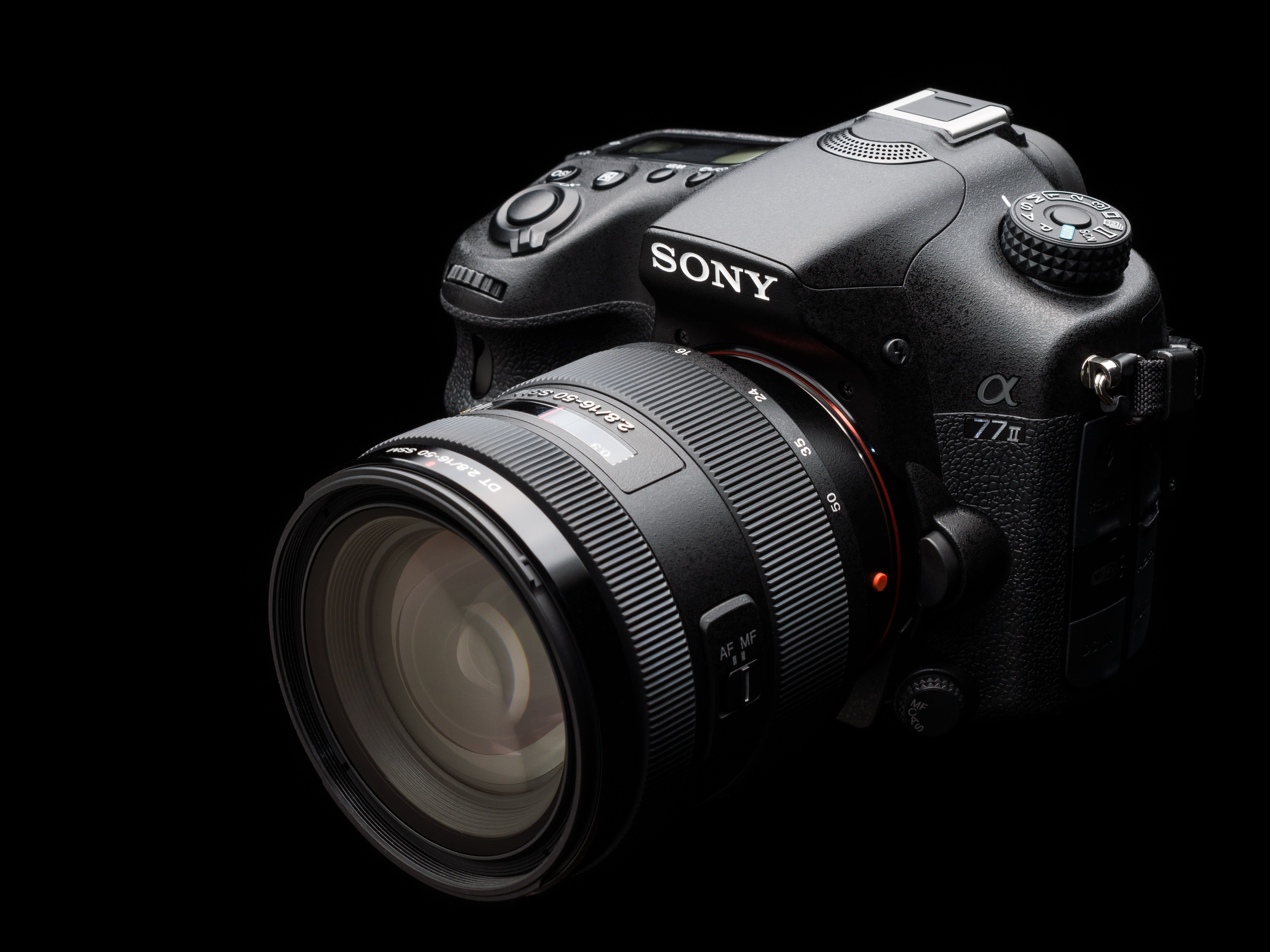
- Sony α77 II with DT 16-50mm F2.8 SSM kit lens

Overview
- Maker: Sony
- Type: SLT
- Released: June 2014; 11 years ago
- Intro price: USD 1,198 (body), USD 1,798 (kit)

Lens
- Lens mount: Sony A-mount
- Lens: Interchangeable lens

Sensor/medium
- Sensor: APS-C
- Sensor type: Exmor CMOS Sensor
- Sensor size: 23.5mm x 15.6mm
- Sensor maker: Sony
- Maximum resolution: 24.3 megapixels 6000 x 4000
- Film speed: ISO 100-25600
- Storage media: Memory Stick PRO Duo, Pro-HG Duo, PRO-XC HG Duo media SD, SDHC and SDXC card

Flash
- Flash: Built-in pop-up flash
- Flash synchronization: 1/250 s
- Compatible flashes: Shoe Mount flash

Shutter
- Shutter: Electronically-controlled, vertical-traverse, focal-plane shutter
- Shutter speeds: 1/8000 to 30 seconds, bulb
- Continuous shooting: 12.0 fps

Viewfinder
- Viewfinder: EVF with eye sensor
- Electronic viewfinder: 0.5" 2.4M dots OLED Viewfinder
- Viewfinder magnification: 1.09
- Frame coverage: 100%

Image processing
- Image processor: BIONZ X

General
- Video recording: MP4, AVCHD 1080p up to 60 fps
- LCD screen: 3.0" 1.23M dots touchscreen variable-angle monitor
- Battery: NP-FM500H Li-ion
- AV port(s): HDMI D, ⌀3.5 mm audio jack
- Data port(s): USB 2.0, Wi-Fi
- Body features: Enhanced in-body image stabilization
- Dimensions: 5.61 in × 4.10 in × 3.19 in (142 mm × 104 mm × 81 mm)
- Weight: 1,351 g (2.978 lb) including battery and memory card
- Made in: Thailand

The Sony Alpha 77 II (ILCA-77M2), stylized as the Sony α77 II, is an interchangeable-lens camera aimed at the advanced amateur. It replaced the Sony Alpha 77 model in June 2014. It is similar in design to its predecessor, including the use of a SLT transparent mirror and electronic viewfinder.

== Specifications ==
The successor of Sony Alpha 77 model, the Sony Alpha 77 II is similar in design to its antecedent, including the use of a SLT transparent mirror and electronic viewfinder. It features a BIONZ X image processor and is compatible with A-mount lenses. GPS has been dropped in favour of Wi-Fi and NFC. The focus area is wider and denser, with a class-leading 79 AF points including 15 crossing sensor combined with subject tracking and eye-focus capabilities. The SLT design avoids the need to flip the mirror out of the way with every shot, allowing a rapid 12 fps burst speed for up to 60 frames in full resolution. Unlike most DSLR cameras, the phase-detect focus unit is operational during live-view and video (which is Full HD at 60p/50p and 24p/25p). The resolution of the camera is 24 megapixels. Sony's A-mount cameras feature in-body image stabilisation and the α77 II is the first of such to also stabilise the viewfinder when taking still images. ISO ranges from 50 to 25600. APS-C sized CMOS sensor.

AVCHD and MPEG-4 recording of full HD at 1920 x 1080 (1080i60 / 1080i50 @ 24M (Mode "FX"), 1080i60 / 1080i50 @ 17M (Mode "FH"), 1080p60 / 1080p50 @ 28M (Mode "PS"), 1080p25 @ 24M (Mode "FX"), 1080p24 @ 24M (Mode "FX"), 1080p25 @ 17M (Mode "FH"), 1080p24 @ 17M (Mode "FH"), 1440×1080 @ 12M, VGA @ 3M)

== Reception ==
Angela Nicholson of TechRadar gave the camera four and a half stars, calling the unit "great" as a whole for enthusiasts wanting to shoot "a range of subjects in a wide variety of conditions." Callum McInerney-Riley of Amateur Photographer regarded the autofocus, graphical user interface and "comprehensive" wireless features as pros to the camera, but cited the harshness of the noise reduction and overexposure due to its translucent mirror, along with its lack of a GPS, as cons. Moritz Wanke of Chip gave it a rating of 93.8 percent, concluding it to be an improvement of its predecessor and the best camera containing an APS-C image sensor in the market. Writing for Zoom.nl, Cees de Jonge gave it a 7.9 out of 10, being surprised at its SLT designation, which he considered "passé".

== Gallery ==
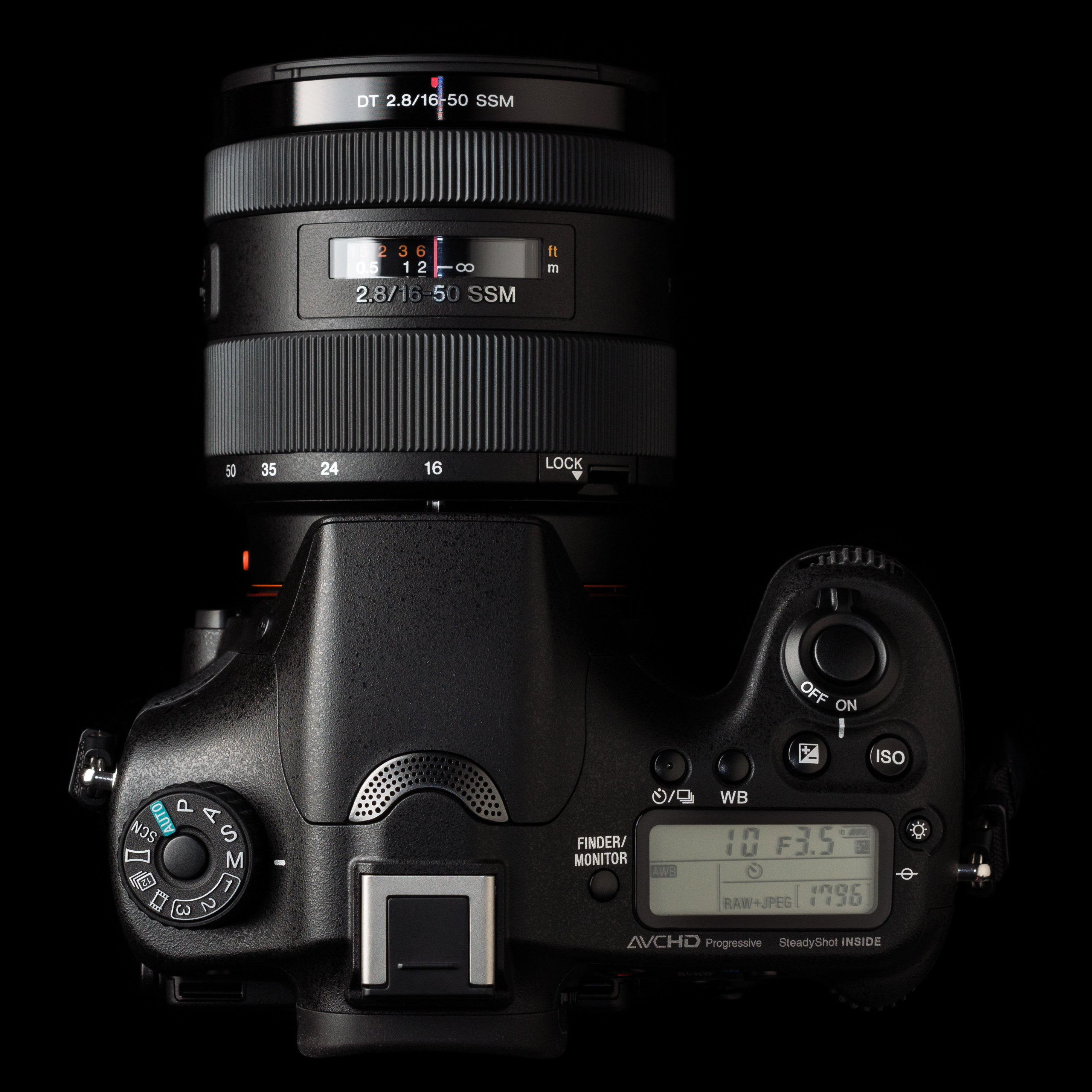
From above

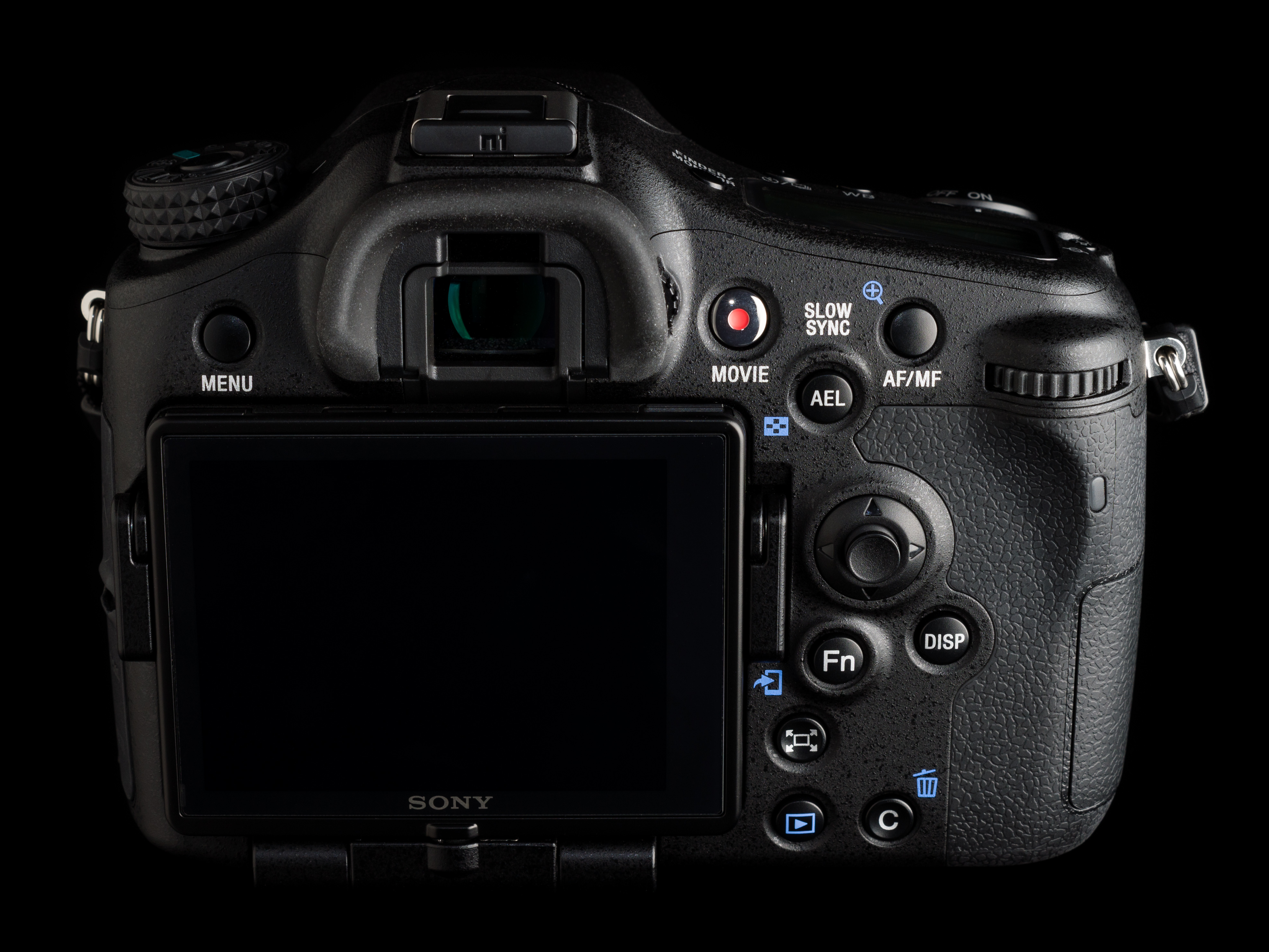
From behind

| Level | Sensor | 2004 | 2005 | 2006 | 2007 | 2008 | 2009 | 2010 | 2011 | | 2012 | 2013 | 2014 | 2015 | 2016 | 2017 | 2018 | 2019 | 2020 |
| Professional | Full frame | | | | | | α900 | | | | | α99 | | | | α99 II | | | |
| Professional | Full frame | | | | | | | α850 | | | | | | | | | | | |
| High-end | APS-C | | DG-7D | | | α700 | | | | α77 | | | | α77 II | | | | | |
| Midrange | APS-C | | | | | | | | | α65 | | | | | α68 | | | | |
| Upper-entry | APS-C | | | | | | | | α55 | | α57 | | | | | | | | |
| Upper-entry | APS-C | | | | α100 | | | α550 ^{F} | α580 | | | | α58 | | | | | | |
| Upper-entry | APS-C | | DG-5D | | | | | α500 | α560 | | | | | | | | | | |
| Upper-entry | APS-C | | | | | | | α450 | | | | | | | | | | | |
| Entry-level | APS-C | | | | | | | | α33 | α35 | α37 | | | | | | | | |
| Entry-level | APS-C | | | | | α350 ^{F} | | α380 | α390 | | | | | | | | | | |
| Entry-level | APS-C | | | | | α300 | | α330 | | | | | | | | | | | |
| Entry-level | APS-C | | | | | α200 | | α230 | α290 | | | | | | | | | | |
| Early models | Minolta 7000 with SB-70/SB-70S (1986) · Minolta 9000 with SB-90/SB-90S (1986) (Still video SLRs); Minolta MS-C1100 (1992) · Minolta RD-175 (1995) | | | | | | | | | | | | | | | | | | |
| Level | Sensor | | | | | | | | | | | | | | | | | | |
| Level | Sensor | 2004 | 2005 | 2006 | 2007 | 2008 | 2009 | 2010 | 2011 | | 2012 | 2013 | 2014 | 2015 | 2016 | 2017 | 2018 | 2019 | 2020 |
