= Sony α99 II =

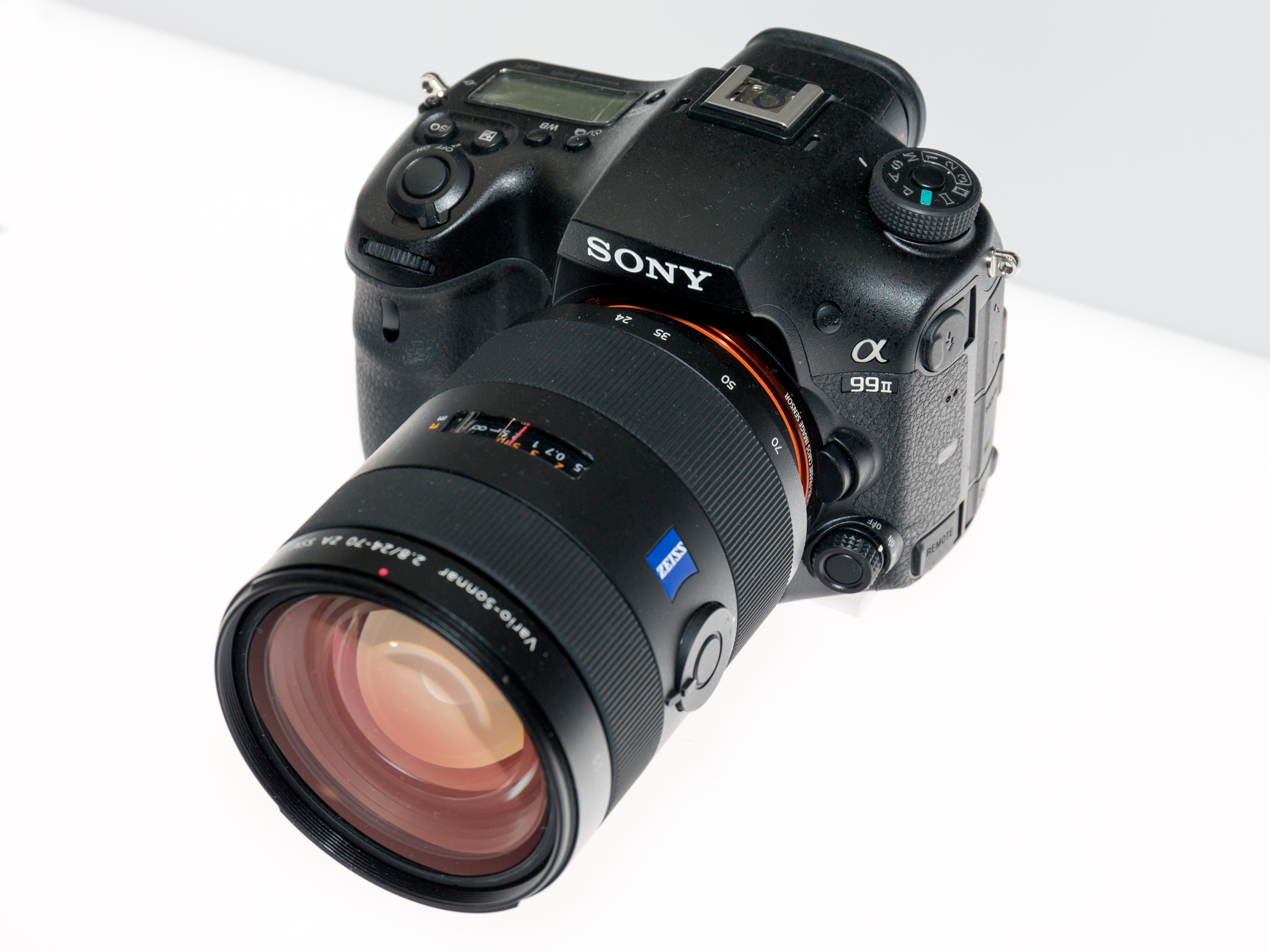

Overview
- Type: Digital single-lens translucent camera
- Intro price: US$3199 MSRP (Sep 2016)

Lens
- Lens mount: Sony A-mount

Sensor/medium
- Sensor: Exmor R
- Sensor type: BSI-CMOS
- Sensor size: 35.8 mm × 23.9 mm (full frame)
- Maximum resolution: 7952 x 5304 (42.4 megapixels)

Shutter
- Frame rate: 12 fps 8 fps (live view)
- Shutter speeds: 1/8000 – 30 s

Viewfinder
- Viewfinder: 0.5″ 2.36M-dot OLED Tru-finder

Image processing
- Image processor: Bionz X

General
- LCD screen: 3.0" WhiteMagic TFT LCD, 1,228,800 dots
- Battery: NP-FM500H lithium-ion battery
- Body features: 5-axis in-body image stabilization for stills and video
- Dimensions: 143×104×76 mm (5.6×4.1×3.0 in) (5.63 * 4.09 * 2.99″)
- Weight: 849 g (30 oz) (including batteries)

The Sony α99 II is a flagship Sony SLT camera and continues the line of Sony A-mount camera bodies. It was first announced by Sony on September 19, 2016 at photokina 2016 and replaced the original Sony α99. Its single-lens translucent design allows for faster focusing and shooting than DSLRs. Consequently, at 12 FPS, it can shoot roughly twice as fast in continuous burst mode as competing models as of 2016. The α99 II also features best-in-class low-light autofocus.

Initial demand for the camera exceeded the supply in Japan and major American retailers also quickly sold out of allocated amounts and had backordered supplies as of December 2016.

The a99 II was the last A-mount camera. After five years from its launch, Sony decided to discontinue all A-mount cameras including the a99 II, in 2021. That was the end of the A-mount cameras lineup that lasted 36 years from 1985 during the Minolta SLR film era until 2021 with Sony digital SLT technology.

== See also ==
- Exmor R

Level	Sensor	2004	2005	2006	2007	2008	2009	2010	2011		2012	2013	2014	2015	2016	2017	2018	2019	2020
Professional	Full frame						α900					α99				α99 II			
Professional	Full frame							α850											
High-end	APS-C		DG-7D			α700				α77				α77 II					
Midrange	APS-C									α65					α68				
Upper-entry	APS-C								α55		α57								
Upper-entry	APS-C				α100			α550 ^{F}	α580				α58						
Upper-entry	APS-C		DG-5D					α500	α560										
Upper-entry	APS-C							α450											
Entry-level	APS-C								α33	α35	α37								
Entry-level	APS-C					α350 ^{F}		α380	α390										
Entry-level	APS-C					α300		α330											
Entry-level	APS-C					α200		α230	α290										
Early models	Minolta 7000 with SB-70/SB-70S (1986) · Minolta 9000 with SB-90/SB-90S (1986) (Still video SLRs); Minolta MS-C1100 (1992) · Minolta RD-175 (1995)																		
Level	Sensor																		
Level	Sensor	2004	2005	2006	2007	2008	2009	2010	2011		2012	2013	2014	2015	2016	2017	2018	2019	2020
