= Sony SLT camera =

Range of cameras using a semi-transparent mirror

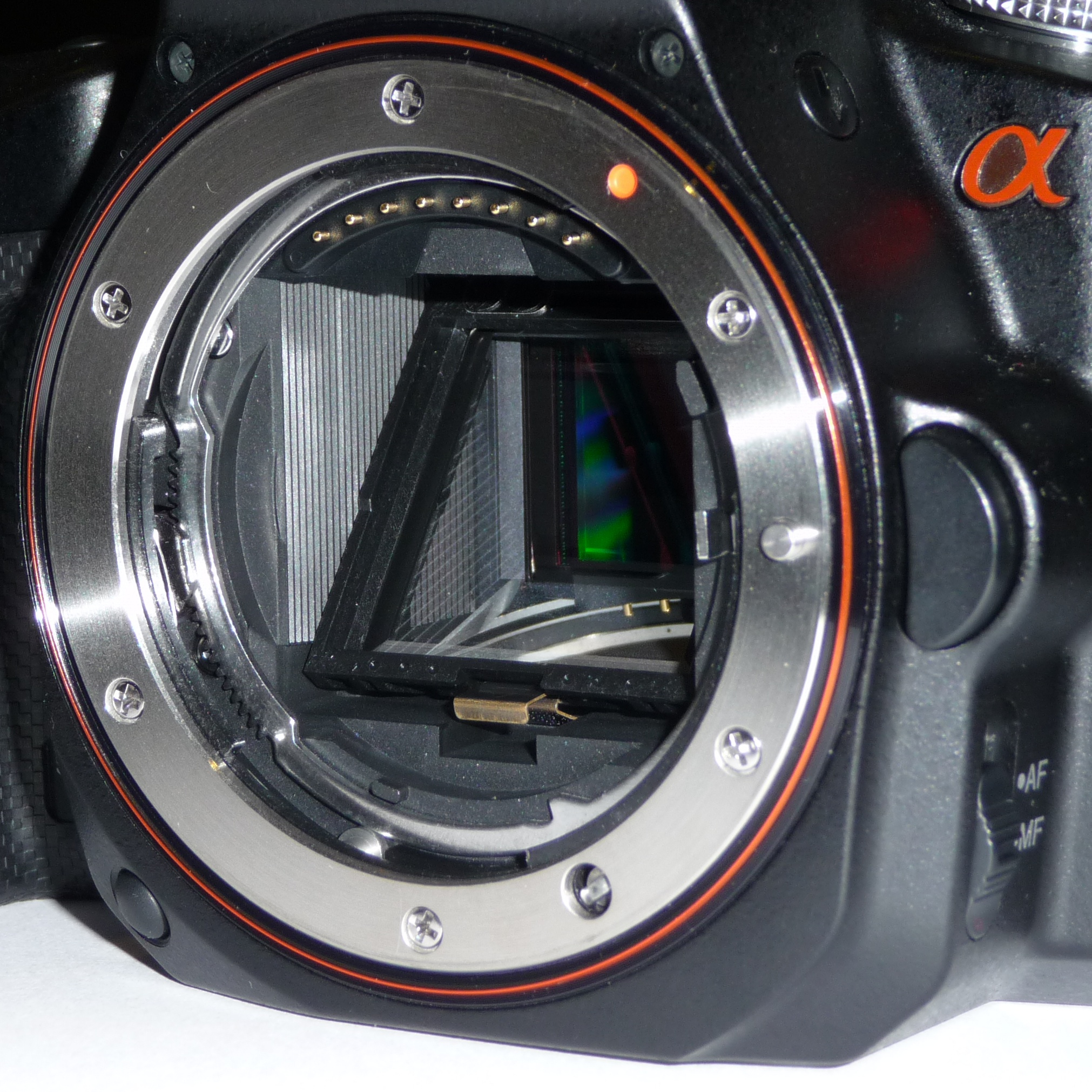
The Sony SLT design features a pellicle mirror which allows light to strike both the digital image sensor (parallel to the lens mount, behind mirror) and phase-detection autofocus sensor (perpendicular to the mount) at all times.

Single-lens translucent (SLT) is a Sony proprietary designation for Sony Alpha cameras which employ a pellicle mirror, electronic viewfinder, and phase-detection autofocus system. They employ the same Minolta A-mount as Sony Alpha DSLR cameras.

Sony SLT cameras have a semi-transparent fixed mirror which diverts a portion of incoming light to a phase-detection autofocus sensor, while the remaining light strikes the digital image sensor. The image sensor feeds the electronic viewfinder and also records still images and video on command. The utility of the SLT design is to allow full-time phase-detection autofocus during electronic viewfinder, live view, and video recording operation. With the advent of digital image sensors with integrated phase-detection, the SLT design is no longer required to accomplish this goal, as evidenced by cameras such as the Sony a7, Fujifilm X-series, and Nikon 1, although the SLT design avoids having pixels unavailable for image formation due to their space on the sensor being occupied by a dedicated phase detection autofocus sensor.

The term "translucent" is a misnomer for the actual SLT design, which employs a pellicle mirror that is not translucent. Pellicle mirrors have been used in single-lens reflex cameras from at least the 1960s (see Canon Pellix) and in the Pentax EI2000/Hewlett Packard 912 digital SLR of 2000 which used an optical viewfinder and on-sensor contrast-detection focusing.

== List of SLT cameras ==
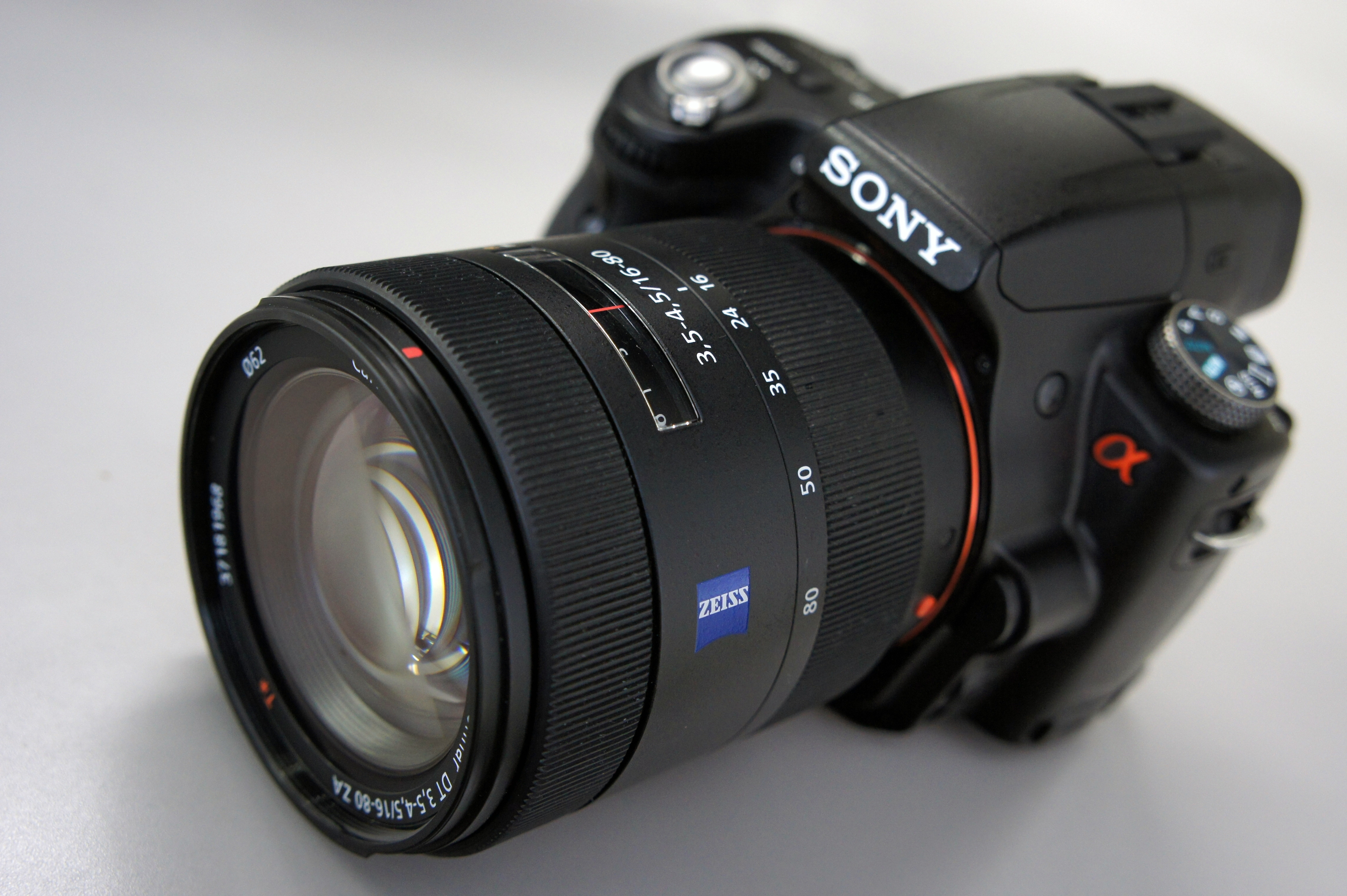
Sony Alpha 55

Model	Announcement	Megapixels	Sensor	Screen	Built-in flash
Sony Alpha 33	2010	14 MP	APS-C	3" articulated	Yes (pop-up)
Sony Alpha 35	2011	16 MP	APS-C	3" fixed	Yes (pop-up)
Sony Alpha 37	2012	16 MP	APS-C	2.7" tilting	Yes (pop-up)
Sony Alpha 55	2010	16 MP	APS-C	3" articulated	Yes (pop-up)
Sony Alpha 57	2012	16 MP	APS-C	3" articulated	Yes (pop-up)
Sony Alpha 58	2013	20 MP	APS-C	2.7" tilting	Yes (pop-up)
Sony Alpha 65	2011	24 MP	APS-C	3" articulated	Yes (pop-up)
Sony Alpha 68	2015	24 MP	APS-C	2.7" tilting	Yes (pop-up)
Sony Alpha 77	2011	24 MP	APS-C	3" fully articulated	Yes (pop-up)
Sony Alpha 77 II	2014	24 MP	APS-C	3" fully articulated	Yes (pop-up)
Sony Alpha 99	2012	24 MP	Full-frame sensor	3" fully articulated	No
Sony Alpha 99 II	2016	42 MP	Full-frame sensor	3" fully articulated	No

All of the above cameras record 1920x1080 video at 60i/30p (NTSC regions) or 50i/25p (PAL regions), in MPEG-4, AVCHD or H.264 formats. The Alpha 65 and 77 also records video at 50p or 60p, and the Alpha 99II records 4k video at 100 Mbit/s (using XAVC S) with full sensor read-out.

Source: summarised from the full comparison table at DP Review.

== See also ==
- Digital single-lens reflex camera
- Sony ILCA camera

Level	Sensor	2004	2005	2006	2007	2008	2009	2010	2011		2012	2013	2014	2015	2016	2017	2018	2019	2020
Professional	Full frame						α900					α99				α99 II			
Professional	Full frame							α850											
High-end	APS-C		DG-7D			α700				α77				α77 II					
Midrange	APS-C									α65					α68				
Upper-entry	APS-C								α55		α57								
Upper-entry	APS-C				α100			α550 ^{F}	α580				α58						
Upper-entry	APS-C		DG-5D					α500	α560										
Upper-entry	APS-C							α450											
Entry-level	APS-C								α33	α35	α37								
Entry-level	APS-C					α350 ^{F}		α380	α390										
Entry-level	APS-C					α300		α330											
Entry-level	APS-C					α200		α230	α290										
Early models	Minolta 7000 with SB-70/SB-70S (1986) · Minolta 9000 with SB-90/SB-90S (1986) (Still video SLRs); Minolta MS-C1100 (1992) · Minolta RD-175 (1995)																		
Level	Sensor																		
Level	Sensor	2004	2005	2006	2007	2008	2009	2010	2011		2012	2013	2014	2015	2016	2017	2018	2019	2020
