= Minolta AF Zoom 70-210mm f/4 =

Minolta AF Zoom 70–210mm f/4
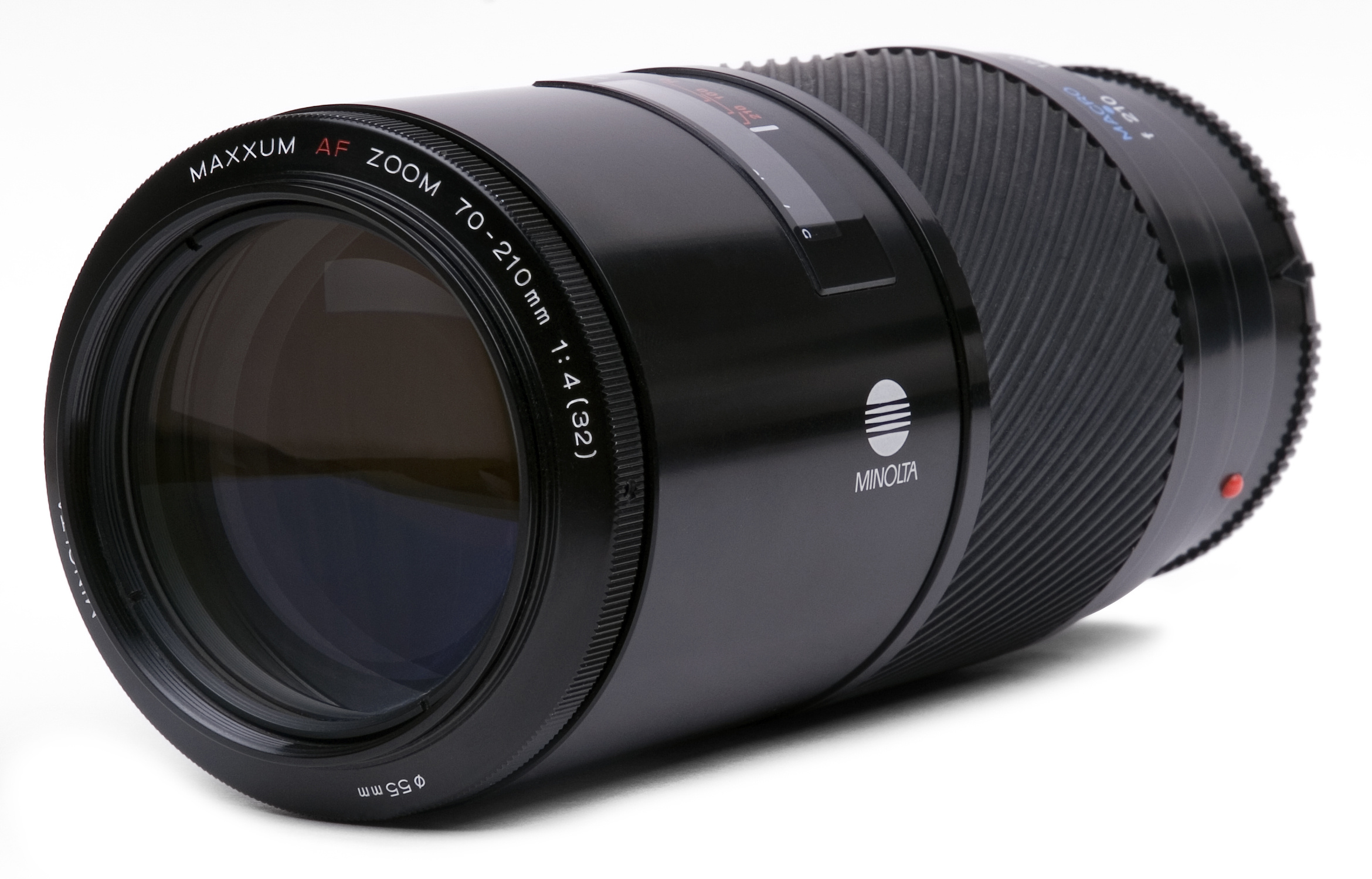
- Maker: Minolta

Technical data
- Type: Zoom
- Focal length: 70-210mm
- Crop factor: 34.3–11.7°
- Aperture (max/min): f/4–f/32
- Close focus distance: 1.1 m
- Max. magnification: 1/4
- Diaphragm blades: 7 blades, straight
- Construction: 12 elements in 9 groups

Features
- Ultrasonic motor: No No
- Lens-based stabilization: No No

Physical
- Max. length: 168 mm
- Weight: 695 g
- Filter diameter: 55 mm

Accessories
- Lens hood: Metal or plastic clip-on

Angle of view
- Horizontal: 34.3–11.7°

History
- Introduction: 1985

The Minolta AF Zoom 70–210mm f/4 lens (colloquially known as the "beercan") is an autofocusing telephoto photographic lens compatible with cameras using the Minolta AF lens mount.

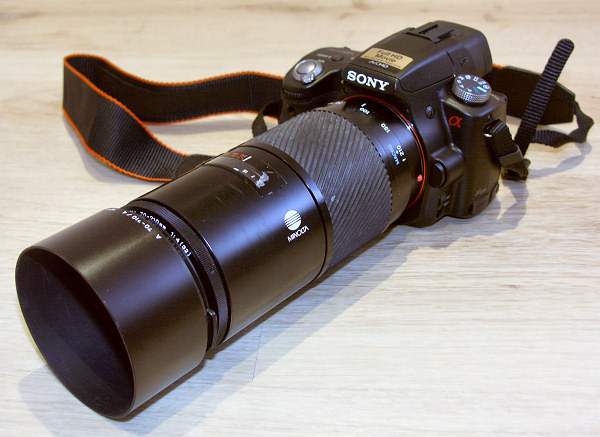
Sony Alpha 55 with Minolta 70–210mm f/4

It was introduced in 1985 at the launch of the Minolta Maxxum/Dynax/Alpha 7000 camera (the first widely successful autofocus SLR) and remained in production for many years. Two years earlier, the lens had been introduced as a one-touch zoom in the manual-focus Minolta SR mount (as a "plain" MD lens). However, production slowed and then eventually stopped for both the AF and MD versions; its successors, the 70-210mm f/3.5-4.5 and 70-210mm f/4.5-5.6 had none of the qualities of the original and build and image quality decreased.

It remains popular, however, for use on digital single lens reflex cameras using the AF system, such as the Konica-Minolta Maxxum 7D or the Sony α. Although relatively bulky and weighty, the lens is valued for its solid build, sharpness, constant maximum aperture and smooth bokeh effect, though it suffers from more pronounced aberrations than equivalent modern designs. It provides a 1:4 magnification (at minimum focus, an object records at 1/4 its size on film or sensor).

== See also ==
- List of Minolta A-mount lenses
