= Sony Alpha 57 =

Sony α 57
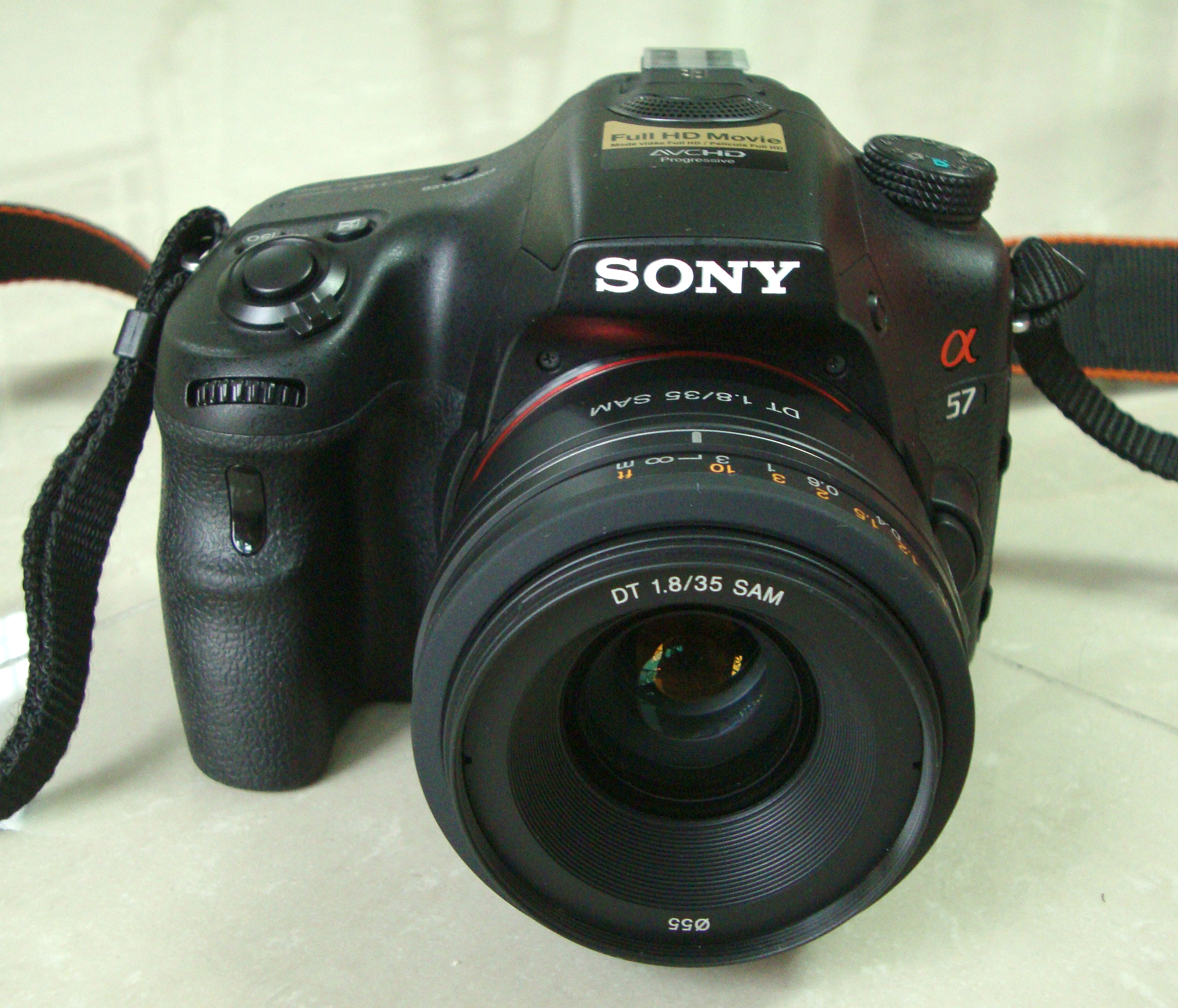

Overview
- Maker: Sony Group
- Type: Digital single-lens translucent camera

Lens
- Lens: interchangeable, Sony A-mount

Sensor/medium
- Sensor: 23.5 mm × 15.6 mm, 16.1 effective megapixels CMOS
- Film speed: Auto: 100-3200; Selectable: 100-16000; Multi Frame NR (up to ISO 25600)
- Storage media: Memory Stick PRO Duo™, Memory Stick PRO-HG Duo™, SD memory card, SDHC memory card, SDXC memory card

Exposure/metering
- Exposure metering: Advanced 1200-zone evaluative metering
- Metering modes: Multi-segment, Center-weighted, Spot

Flash
- Flash: Built-in flash, Range: approx. 3' - 15' (1 m - 5 m); Auto, Fill-flash, Slow Sync., Rear Sync., Hi-speed sync., Red-eye reduction (on/off selectable for Autoflash and fill-flash mode), Wireless;

Shutter
- Shutter: electronically controlled, vertical-traverse, focal-plane Shutter
- Shutter speed range: 30–1/4000 sec, with Bulb, 1/160 sec X-sync
- Continuous shooting: up to 12 Frames Per Second

Viewfinder
- Viewfinder: 0.46" SVGA Xtra Fine EVF (2174 dpi) (Electronic viewfinder) (1,440,000 pixels), Diopter Adjustment: -4.0 to +3.0 m-1, Field of View: 100%, 1.04x magnification

Image processing
- White balance: Auto WB, Daylight, Shade, Cloudy, Incandescent, Fluorescent (Warm white/Cool white/Day white/Daylight), Flash, C. Temp 2500 to 9900 K, C Filter G7 to M7, 15-step, Custom, AWB micro adjustment

General
- LCD screen: 921k pixel 3-inch TFT LCD
- Battery: InfoLITHIUM® NP-FM500H (7.2 V)
- Weight: Approx. 618 g (with battery & media);
- Made in: Thailand

The Sony Alpha 57 (model name SLT-A57) is a Digital single-lens reflex camera that replaced the A55 in 2012. The camera features an electronic viewfinder and a translucent mirror. The main advantage of a translucent mirror is that it needn't flip up out of the way when taking a picture in order to expose the sensor, but the camera can focus and capture images simultaneously. The camera's 15-point autofocus system can be set to single, continuous or automatic and is arranged towards the centre. The 12-fps burst mode is available only in "speed priority" mode but can reach up to 5.5 fps burst rate in combination with any other settings.

== Feature list ==
- 16.1-megapixel Exmor™ CMOS sensor (4912 × 3264)
- Updated BIONZ™ image processor
- ISO 100 - 16,000 (25,600 with multi-image combination)
- Auto ISO 100 - 3200
- Pull-out three-hinge tilt/swivel 921K dot TruBlack™ LCD screen
- Stereo microphone and external mic socket
- Dust shake sensor cleaning
- second-generation Translucent Mirror Technology™
- 12 fps burst mode at full 8-megapixel resolution
- Tru-Finder™ XGA electronic viewfinder with 1440K dots resolution with full 100% frame coverage.
- AVCHD video recording at 1920 × 1080 (50p/60p (1080p) @ 28 Mbit/s, 50i/60i (1080i) @ 24 Mbit/s, 50i/60i (1080i) @ 17 Mbit/s, 25p/24p (1080p) @ 24 Mbit/s, 25p/24p (1080p) @ 17 Mbit/s, 25p/24p (1080p)) @ 12 Mbit/s)
- MPEG-4 video recording at 1440 × 1080 (approx. 25/30 fps @ 12 Mbit/s (average bit-rate), 640 x 480 (approx 25/30fps @ 3Mbit/s)
- Live View with full-time Phase Detection AF
- 15-point autofocus sensors.
- SteadyShot™ image stabilization system in body
- 3D Sweep Panorama™
- Full tilt/swivel LCD screen
- Multi-frame noise reduction
- Object tracking AF

Level	Sensor	2004	2005	2006	2007	2008	2009	2010	2011		2012	2013	2014	2015	2016	2017	2018	2019	2020
Professional	Full frame						α900					α99				α99 II			
Professional	Full frame							α850											
High-end	APS-C		DG-7D			α700				α77				α77 II					
Midrange	APS-C									α65					α68				
Upper-entry	APS-C								α55		α57								
Upper-entry	APS-C				α100			α550 ^{F}	α580				α58						
Upper-entry	APS-C		DG-5D					α500	α560										
Upper-entry	APS-C							α450											
Entry-level	APS-C								α33	α35	α37								
Entry-level	APS-C					α350 ^{F}		α380	α390										
Entry-level	APS-C					α300		α330											
Entry-level	APS-C					α200		α230	α290										
Early models	Minolta 7000 with SB-70/SB-70S (1986) · Minolta 9000 with SB-90/SB-90S (1986) (Still video SLRs); Minolta MS-C1100 (1992) · Minolta RD-175 (1995)																		
Level	Sensor																		
Level	Sensor	2004	2005	2006	2007	2008	2009	2010	2011		2012	2013	2014	2015	2016	2017	2018	2019	2020
