= Sony Alpha 55 =

2010 APS-C digital SLT camera

Sony α55
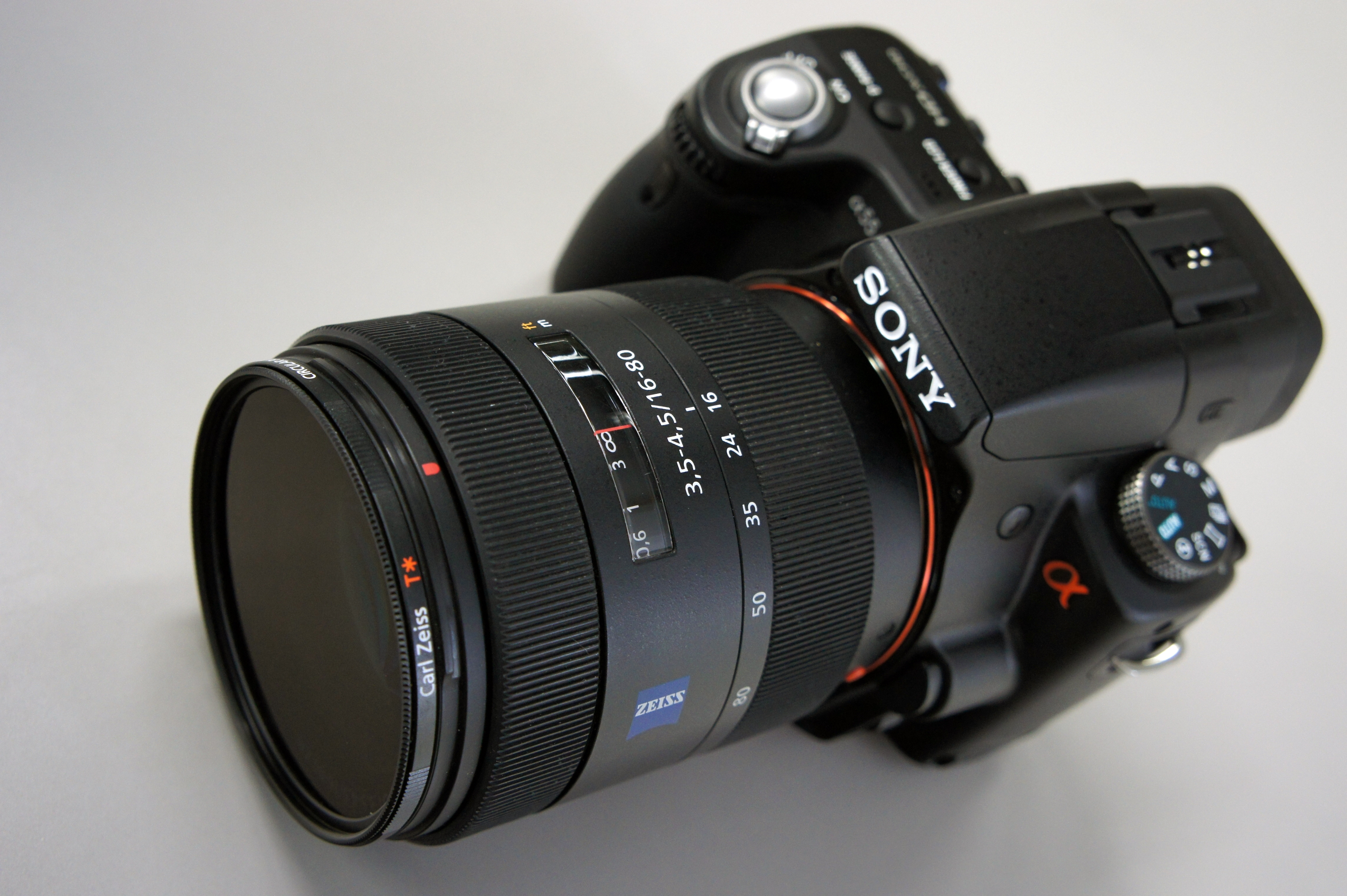
- SLT-A55V + SAL1680Z

Overview
- Maker: Sony
- Type: Digital single-lens translucent camera

Lens
- Lens: Interchangeable, A-mount

Sensor/medium
- Sensor: APS-C CMOS Sensor
- Maximum resolution: 16.2 megapixels
- Film speed: ISO equivalency 100 to 12,800 in 1.0 EV steps, boost to 25,600 in Multi-Frame Noise Reduction mode
- Storage media: SD/SDHC/SDXC/Memory Stick Pro Duo

Focusing
- Focus modes: Single-shot AF, Automatic AF, Continuous AF, Manual Focus
- Focus areas: 15-point (12 line, 3 cross) phase-detection AF system

Exposure/metering
- Exposure modes: Programmed AE (AUTO, AUTO – Flash Off, P), Aperture priority, Shutter priority, Manual, Scene selection
- Exposure metering: TTL full aperture exposure metering system 1200-zone evaluative
- Metering modes: Multi-segment, Centre-weighted, Spot

Flash
- Flash: GN 10 at ISO 100
- Flash bracketing: +`

Shutter
- Shutter: Electronically controlled, Vertical-traverse, Focal-plane Shutter
- Shutter speed range: 30 – 1/4000 sec, bulb
- Continuous shooting: 10 FPS / 6 FPS

Viewfinder
- Viewfinder: EVF, 100% coverage, 1.10× magnification

Image processing
- White balance: Auto / 6 presets / Colour Temperature/Colour Filter / Custom WB

General
- LCD screen: 3.0" TFT LCD, 921k dot resolution, variable-angle tilt/swivel
- Battery: NP-FW50 Lithium-ion battery rechargeable battery
- Optional battery packs: Unavailable
- Dimensions: 124×92×85 mm (4.9×3.6×3.3 in)
- Weight: 441 g (15.6 oz)
- Made in: Thailand

Footnotes
- dpreview

The Sony α55 (model variants SLT-A55V with GPS, SLT-A55 without GPS depending on country) is a midrange-level SLT camera, released after the sony a57 which was released in 2012.

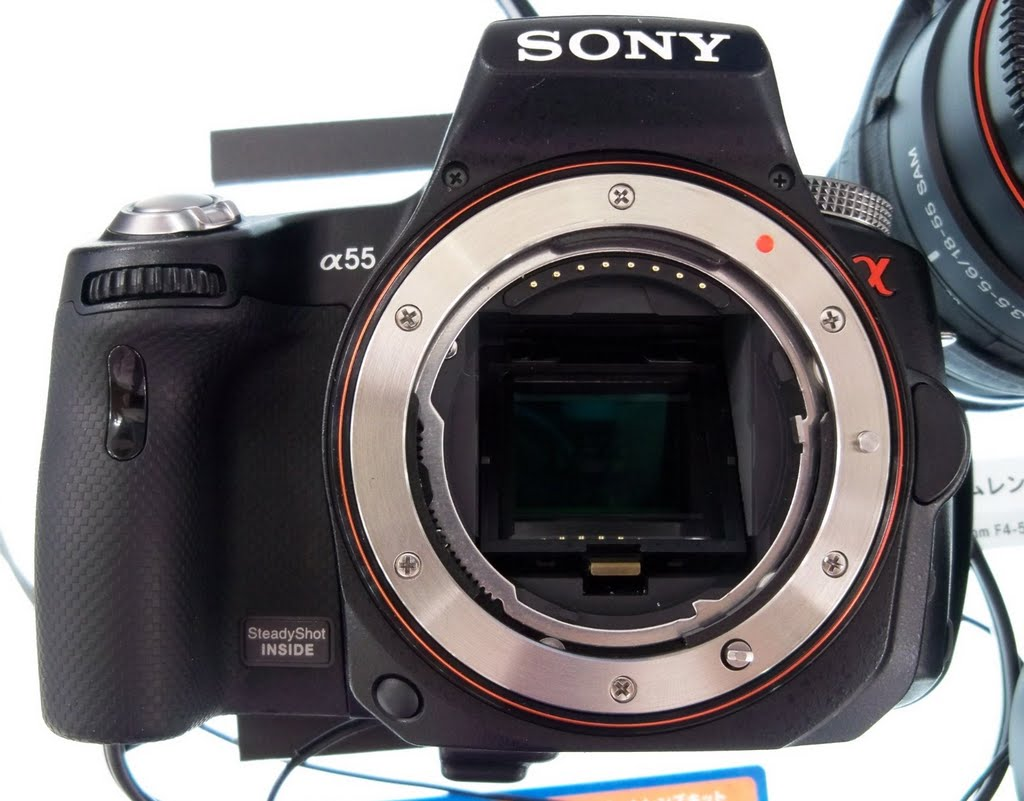
A-mount, APS-C CMOS sensor

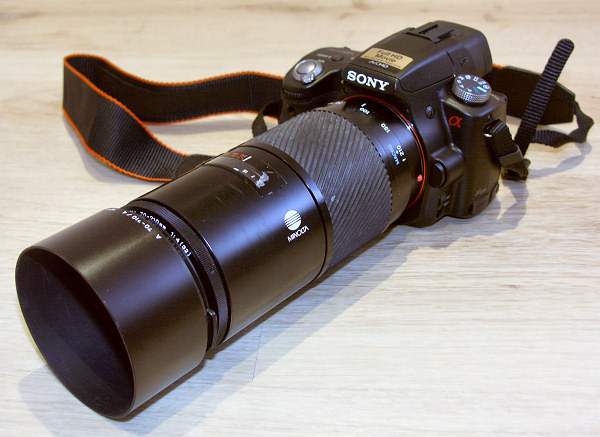
Sony Alpha 55 with Minolta AF 70-210mm f/4 "Beercan" lens

Its design is novel due to its being the first digital single-lens translucent camera (SLT), along with the Sony α33. As an SLT it employs a semi-transparent mirror instead of an opaque mirror, which enables phase detection autofocus in live view.

The design also replaces the optical viewfinder present in conventional DSLR with a high-resolution electronic viewfinder. The translucent mirror is fixed in position so does not have to flip up to take a still image, enabling rapid continuous shots of up to 10 frames per second. The static mirror also eliminates "mirror slap", the noise produced by the movement of the mirror during a shutter actuation, making the A55 quieter than standard DSLRs.

The A55 is one of the first four Sony Alpha DSLR / SLT cameras with video mode included, capable of 1080i. It is also capable of shooting 1080p at 30fps. The SLT design means that it is capable of using phase-detection autofocus during video recording. It has body-integrated image stabilization, and a 16.2 MPx APS-C CMOS sensor.

The camera's body-integrated image stabilization produces heat, causing the camera to stop video recording after these recording times:

Model name	Ambient temperature	Image Stabilization	
Model name	Ambient temperature	On	Off
α55 (SLT-A55V)	20 °C (68 °F)	9 min	Approx. 29 minutes
α55 (SLT-A55V)	30 °C (86 °F)	6 min	13 minutes
α55 (SLT-A55V)	40 °C (104 °F)	3 min	5 minutes
α33 (SLT-A33)	20 °C (68 °F)	11 min	Approx. 29 minutes
α33 (SLT-A33)	30 °C (86 °F)	7 min	Approx. 22 minutes
α33 (SLT-A33)	40 °C (104 °F)	4 min	9 minutes

== Features ==
- Konica Minolta A-mount lens bayonet.

=== Video ===
- AVCHD 1920/1080 50i or 60i (depending on region)
- MPEG-4 1080 30p or 25p (depending on region)

Level	Sensor	2004	2005	2006	2007	2008	2009	2010	2011		2012	2013	2014	2015	2016	2017	2018	2019	2020
Professional	Full frame						α900					α99				α99 II			
Professional	Full frame							α850											
High-end	APS-C		DG-7D			α700				α77				α77 II					
Midrange	APS-C									α65					α68				
Upper-entry	APS-C								α55		α57								
Upper-entry	APS-C				α100			α550 ^{F}	α580				α58						
Upper-entry	APS-C		DG-5D					α500	α560										
Upper-entry	APS-C							α450											
Entry-level	APS-C								α33	α35	α37								
Entry-level	APS-C					α350 ^{F}		α380	α390										
Entry-level	APS-C					α300		α330											
Entry-level	APS-C					α200		α230	α290										
Early models	Minolta 7000 with SB-70/SB-70S (1986) · Minolta 9000 with SB-90/SB-90S (1986) (Still video SLRs); Minolta MS-C1100 (1992) · Minolta RD-175 (1995)																		
Level	Sensor																		
Level	Sensor	2004	2005	2006	2007	2008	2009	2010	2011		2012	2013	2014	2015	2016	2017	2018	2019	2020
