= Sony Alpha 700 =

2007 APS-C digital single-lens reflex camera

Sony α 700
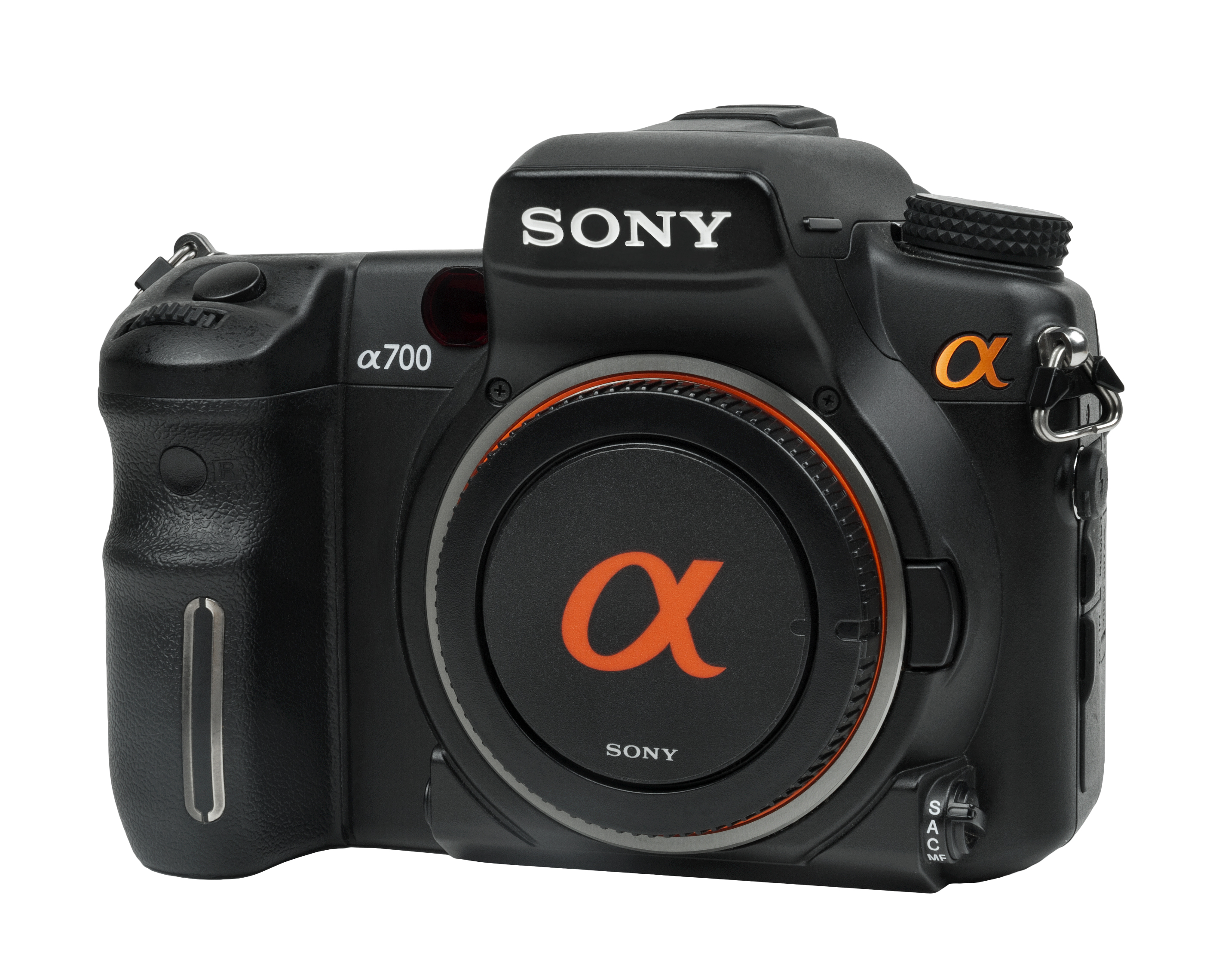

Overview
- Maker: Sony Group
- Type: Digital single-lens reflex camera

Lens
- Lens: A-mount

Sensor/medium
- Sensor: 12.4 effective megapixels CMOS
- Maximum resolution: 4288 × 2856 pixels
- Film speed: Auto, 100 - 6400
- Storage media: CompactFlash I/II, Memory Stick Duo, Memory Stick PRO Duo

Focusing
- Focus areas: 11-points, center double cross-hair

Flash
- Flash: Built in

Shutter
- Shutter speed range: 1/8000 - 30 sec, bulb. X-sync 1/250s (without SteadyShot), 1/200 (with SteadyShot)
- Continuous shooting: 5 frames per second

Viewfinder
- Viewfinder: 95% coverage, 0.9x magnification

General
- LCD screen: 921K-point (307k pixel), 3-inch TFT LCD
- Battery: lithium ion battery pack
- Weight: 690 g (24 oz) (without battery)
- Made in: Japan

The Sony α700 (DSLR-A700) was the second model launched in the Sony α series of APS-C sensor digital single-lens reflex cameras, following the α100, with several improvements over the latter. Some of the camera's technology was inspired by the former Konica Minolta Maxxum 7D, such as the man-machine command interface/commands, LCD menus, viewfinder, and lens mount.

On March 8, 2007, at the PMA Trade Show, Sony announced two new α cameras, both positioned to be "above" the α100 in the Alpha line-up in terms of price and functionality. One model was referred to as a "high amateur" model, with a release date of late 2007. The α700 was discontinued, and its successor, the A77 (SLT-A77), was announced on August 24, 2011, with availability from October 2011.

== Release ==
On September 6, 2007, Sony announced that the Sony α700 would be launched on November 16, 2007. However, the α700 went on sale almost immediately. By the end of Sept 2007, the α700 could be ordered from sonystyle.com or at many Best Buy locations. Featuring the Exmor CMOS sensor with 12.24 Mpixels capable of images at a maximum of 4288 × 2856 resolution, together with a BIONZ image processor for supporting RAW noise reduction and ISO 3200 and 6400 boost sensitivity. Also featuring HDMI output and a magnesium alloy and polycarbonate body. The camera has the combo with the DT16-105 lens kit (DT 16-105mm F3.5-5.6) at ¥230,000, also the body only camera option at ¥180,000.

== Noise reduction ==
The α700 initially received criticism from the review community for their "cooked RAWs", a function that integrated a noise reduction algorithm on high-ISO images – including on raw files (hence, "cooked" into the files). After its release, Sony released a series of firmware updates, but the noise reduction issue was not resolved until the fourth update, which added a variable setting for noise reduction. Other updates included extending exposure bracketing 2 EV and improving high-ISO image grain.

== Comparison with Sony α350 ==
The α700 had a lower pixel resolution than the later α350 (12.4 vs. 14.2), and the α350 included additional features (Live preview mode, automatic pop-up flash) at a lower price. However, the α700 used a pentaprism viewfinder instead of a pentamirror, had a higher burst speed (5 frames per second vs 2.5), had a higher resolution LCD screen, magnesium alloy body, twin control dials, better environmental seals, dual flash media slots (CF and MS-DUO), a PC Sync socket, more autofocus points, a stronger autofocus motor, and HDMI output. The α350's sensor was also a CCD sensor, as opposed to the α700's Exmor CMOS sensor which granted the α700 superior low-light performance.

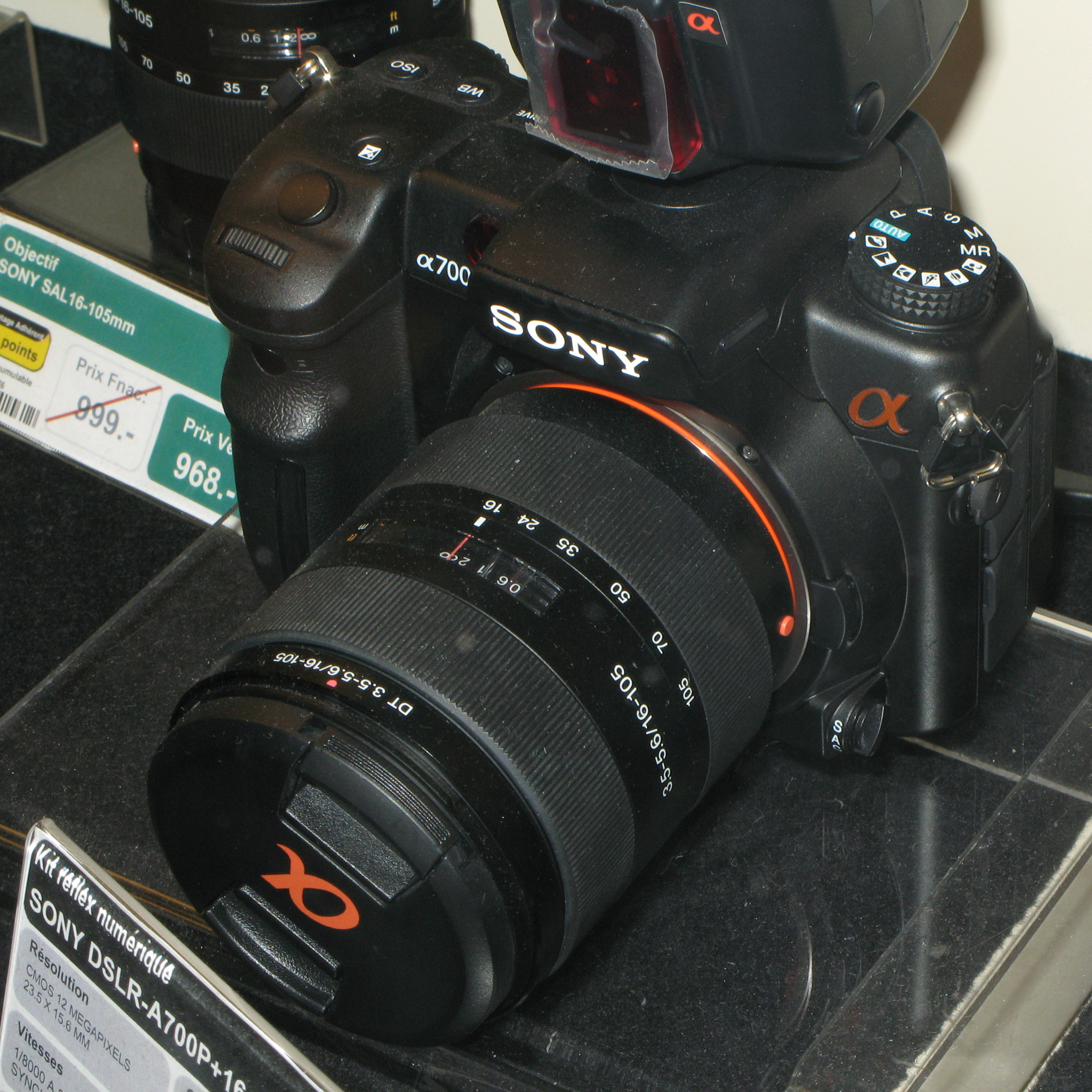

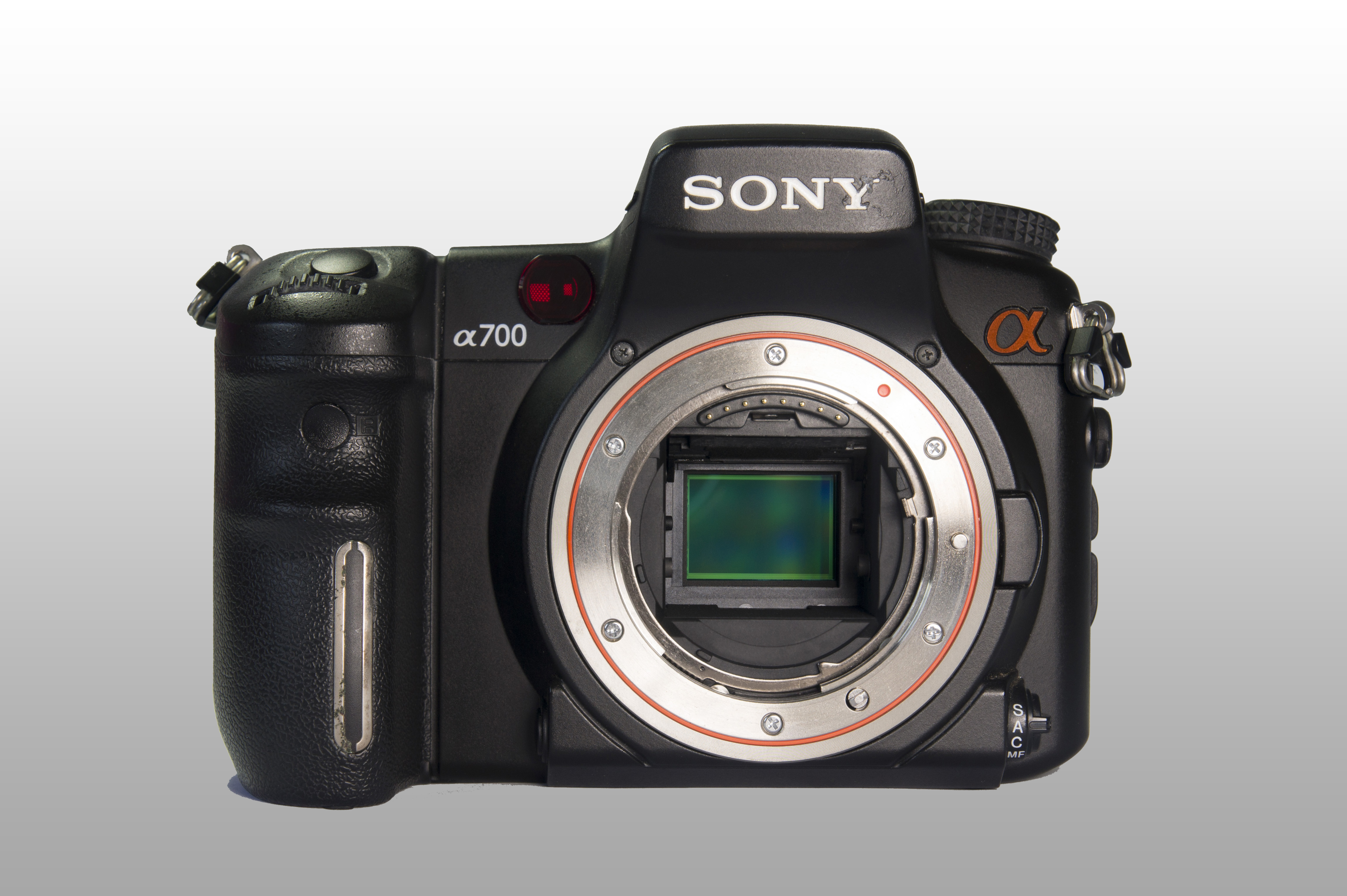
Sony A700 with sensor visible

Level	Sensor	2004	2005	2006	2007	2008	2009	2010	2011		2012	2013	2014	2015	2016	2017	2018	2019	2020
Professional	Full frame						α900					α99				α99 II			
Professional	Full frame							α850											
High-end	APS-C		DG-7D			α700				α77				α77 II					
Midrange	APS-C									α65					α68				
Upper-entry	APS-C								α55		α57								
Upper-entry	APS-C				α100			α550 ^{F}	α580				α58						
Upper-entry	APS-C		DG-5D					α500	α560										
Upper-entry	APS-C							α450											
Entry-level	APS-C								α33	α35	α37								
Entry-level	APS-C					α350 ^{F}		α380	α390										
Entry-level	APS-C					α300		α330											
Entry-level	APS-C					α200		α230	α290										
Early models	Minolta 7000 with SB-70/SB-70S (1986) · Minolta 9000 with SB-90/SB-90S (1986) (Still video SLRs); Minolta MS-C1100 (1992) · Minolta RD-175 (1995)																		
Level	Sensor																		
Level	Sensor	2004	2005	2006	2007	2008	2009	2010	2011		2012	2013	2014	2015	2016	2017	2018	2019	2020
