= Sony Alpha 77 =

Sony α77
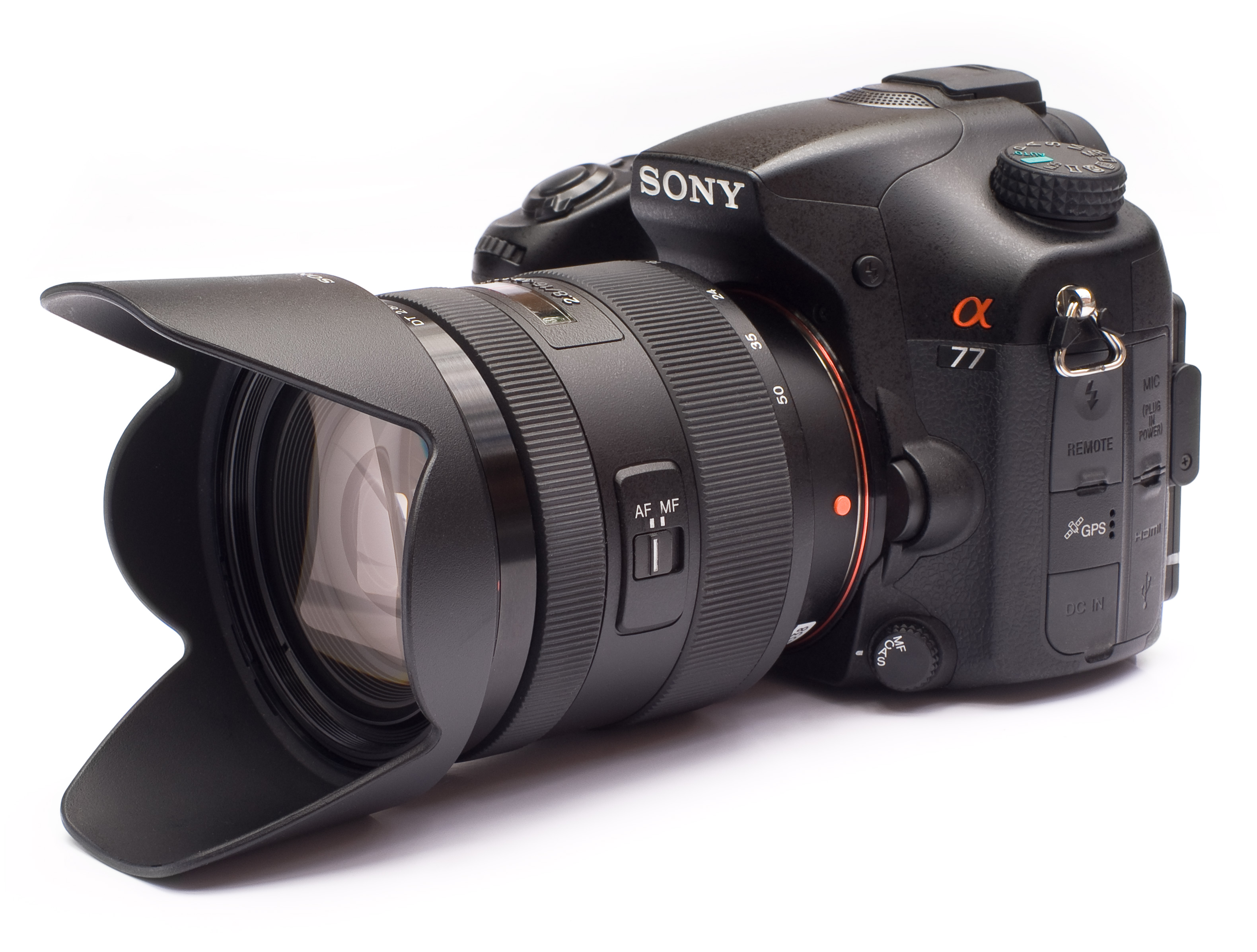
- SLT-A77V + SAL-1650

Overview
- Maker: Sony Group
- Type: Digital single-lens translucent camera

Lens
- Lens: Interchangeable, Sony A-mount

Sensor/medium
- Sensor: Exmor APS HD CMOS sensor (23.5 X 15.6mm)
- Maximum resolution: Approx. 24.3 megapixels
- Film speed: ISO 50-16000
- Storage media: Memory Stick PRO Duo/Pro-HG Duo/PRO-HG HX Duo media - SD, SDHC and SDXC memory card

Focusing
- Focus modes: Predictive control(AF-A, AF-C), Focus Lock, Eye-start AF, Manual-Focus
- Focus areas: Wide (auto, 19 points)/Zone/Spot/Local selectable

Exposure/metering
- Exposure modes: Portrait, Landscape, Macro, Sports action, Sunset, Night portrait, Night View, Handheld Twilight, (A) Aperture Priority, (P) Program Mode, (S) Shutter Priority, (M) Manual mode
- Exposure metering: Advanced 1200-zone evaluative metering, Multi-segment, Center-weighted, Spot

Flash
- Flash: Built-in, Pop-up Auto, Auto, Fill-flash, Slow Sync., Rear Sync., Hi-speed sync., Red-eye reduction (on/off selectable for Autoflash and fill-flash mode), Wireless, Off, ADI flash / Pre-flash TTL / Manual flash
- Flash bracketing: 0.3/0.5/0.7/2.0/3.0EV steps, 3/5 frames(2.0/3.0EV: only 3 frames) selectable

Shutter
- Shutter: Electronically-controlled, vertical-traverse, focal-plane shutter
- Shutter speed range: 1/8000 to 30 seconds, bulb
- Continuous shooting: 24.3megapixel at 12fps

Viewfinder
- Viewfinder: TruFinder XGA OLED Electronic View Finder(2,359k dots)

Image processing
- White balance: Auto, Daylight, Shade, Cloudy, Incandescent, Fluorescent (Warm White, Cool White, Day White, Daylight), Flash, Setting the color temperature, Color Filter, Custom

General
- LCD screen: 3.0” TFT Xtra Fine LCD (921,600 pixels) w/TruBlack technology
- Battery: InfoLITHIUM NP-FM500H
- Optional battery packs: Sony SLT-A77 VG-C77AM Vertical battery grip
- Dimensions: Width (mm) 142.6 Height (mm) 104.0 Depth (mm) 80.9
- Weight: Approx. 1 lb 7 oz (650 g) (excl battery, lens & media) Approx. 1 lb 9.8 oz (730 g) (w/battery & media)
- Made in: Thailand

The Sony α77 was the flagship for Sony's midrange Alpha SLT camera line.

The successor to the Sony A700, it is equipped with a 24.3 MP APS-C HD CMOS sensor and has a 12-fps burst-shooting mode.

The camera is fitted with Sony's patented “translucent mirror” technology.

On 1 May 2014 its replacement, the α77 II (ILCA-77M2) was announced with availability in June.

== Model variants ==
Model variants of the α77 camera body:

- SLT-A77V with GPS.
- SLT-A77 without GPS (depending on country).

Depending on country/market, the α77 camera is also available in different kits:

- SLT-A77VQ (α77V+ 16-50mm lens).
- SLT-A77VK (α77V+ 18-55mm lens).
- SLT-A77VM (α77V+ 18-135mm lens).

== Lens mount ==
Sony Alpha SLT-A77 uses A-mount lens bayonet.

== Features ==
=== Image features ===
- 24.3 megapixel Exmor APS-C HD CMOS sensor.
- Updated BIONZ Image Processor.
- 2nd generation Translucent Mirror Technology.
- Multi-frame Noise Reduction.

=== Autofocus and metering ===
- 19-point autofocus sensors with 11 cross type sensors.
- TTL phase-detection AF.
- Object tracking AF.
- AF Micro Adjust.
- 1200 Zone exposure metering.

=== ISO ===
- ISO 100 - 16,000 (25,600 with multi-image combination. Expands down to ISO 80, 64 and 50).
- Auto ISO with customizable lower and upper limits.

=== Shutter ===
- 12fps burst mode at full 24.3 megapixel resolution.
- 1/8000 - 30sec (and Bulb) is the shutter speed range.
- Shutter rated for 150,000 actuations.

=== Ergonomics and functions ===
- TruFinder XGA OLED electronic viewfinder with 2359K dots resolution with full 100% frame coverage.
- TruBlack XtraFine LCD screen (3"/ 7,5 cm) with 921.6K dots resolution with pull-out three-hinge tilt/swivel functionality.
- Live View with full-time Phase Detection AF.
- Top panel LCD with illumination.
- Built-in dark red auto-focus illuminator.
- Dual anti-dust sensor cleaning system.
- SteadyShot INSIDE, in-body image stabilization system.
- D-Range Optimiser (5 levels and auto).
- Stereo microphone and external mic socket.
- A magnesium alloy body with weather sealing.
- Built in GPS (SLT-A77V model only).
- UHS-I compatible.
- 3D Sweep Panorama.

=== Video ===
- Full HD Movies in 1080i60, 1080p60, 1080p24, 1080i50, 1080p50, 1080p25 and 1440 x 1080 @ 30fps, 640 x 424 @ 30fps most with a range of bitrate settings.
- AVCHD / MP4 recording formats.
- MPEG-4 AVC / H.264 video compressions.
- Dolby Digital (AC-3) / MPEG-4 AAC-LC audio recording formats.

== Firmware updates ==
On 5 February 2013, Sony released a new firmware V1.07, with the following enhancement:

- Added support for Sony α lenses (with automatic compensation compliancy): SAL-100M28, SAL-50M28, SAL-85F28, SAL-18200, SAL-20F28, SAL-28F28.

== Performance ==
In the DxOMark Overall Sensor Score test, which is based on all characteristics of a camera sensor, the APS-C (23.5x15.6mm sensor size) Sony α77 scored 78 points, only one point less than the full-format (36x24mm sensor size) DSLRs Sony Alpha 900 and Canon EOS 5D Mark II.

== Reception ==
Overall the reception for the Sony SLT-A77 since its release has been mixed to positive.

Digital Photography Review awarded the Sony SLT-A77 an overall score of 81% and a silver award, praising its innovative and detailed EVF viewfinder and its fast 12fps shooting mode but criticizing its JPEG quality and noise level especially at high ISO.

Photography Blog gave the Sony SLT-A77 a 5 out of 5 stars praising its innovative EVF display, the inclusion of full 1080p video, built-in GPS, 12fps burst mode, dual control dials, top-panel LCD, a 3-way rear screen and myriad of creative effects such as HDR, Dynamic Range Optimization, creative styles, picture effects and the innovative sweep panorama mode.

== Sony α77 II ==
The α77 II features a BIONZ X image processor similar to the Sony α7 series. It comes with Wi-Fi, NFC and also has 79 AF points with 15 crossing sensor, 12 fps burst speed up to 60 frames in full resolution, continuous AF video Full HD at 60p and 24p. One of the major features is the new sensor with less noise. GPS has been removed, as has the LED AF illuminator—the pop-up flash is now used for focus assist.

| Level | Sensor | 2004 | 2005 | 2006 | 2007 | 2008 | 2009 | 2010 | 2011 | | 2012 | 2013 | 2014 | 2015 | 2016 | 2017 | 2018 | 2019 | 2020 |
| Professional | Full frame | | | | | | α900 | | | | | α99 | | | | α99 II | | | |
| Professional | Full frame | | | | | | | α850 | | | | | | | | | | | |
| High-end | APS-C | | DG-7D | | | α700 | | | | α77 | | | | α77 II | | | | | |
| Midrange | APS-C | | | | | | | | | α65 | | | | | α68 | | | | |
| Upper-entry | APS-C | | | | | | | | α55 | | α57 | | | | | | | | |
| Upper-entry | APS-C | | | | α100 | | | α550 ^{F} | α580 | | | | α58 | | | | | | |
| Upper-entry | APS-C | | DG-5D | | | | | α500 | α560 | | | | | | | | | | |
| Upper-entry | APS-C | | | | | | | α450 | | | | | | | | | | | |
| Entry-level | APS-C | | | | | | | | α33 | α35 | α37 | | | | | | | | |
| Entry-level | APS-C | | | | | α350 ^{F} | | α380 | α390 | | | | | | | | | | |
| Entry-level | APS-C | | | | | α300 | | α330 | | | | | | | | | | | |
| Entry-level | APS-C | | | | | α200 | | α230 | α290 | | | | | | | | | | |
| Early models | Minolta 7000 with SB-70/SB-70S (1986) · Minolta 9000 with SB-90/SB-90S (1986) (Still video SLRs); Minolta MS-C1100 (1992) · Minolta RD-175 (1995) | | | | | | | | | | | | | | | | | | |
| Level | Sensor | | | | | | | | | | | | | | | | | | |
| Level | Sensor | 2004 | 2005 | 2006 | 2007 | 2008 | 2009 | 2010 | 2011 | | 2012 | 2013 | 2014 | 2015 | 2016 | 2017 | 2018 | 2019 | 2020 |
