= Ludwig Bertele =

German inventor (1900–1985)

Ludwig Jakob Bertele
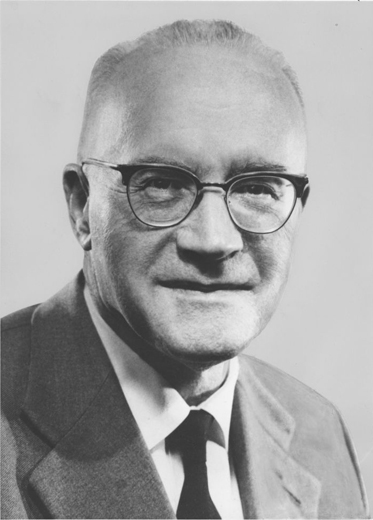
- Born: 25 December 1900; Munich, Germany
- Died: 16 November 1985 (aged 84); Wildhaus, Switzerland
- Occupation(s): optics engineer, optics constructor

Ludwig Jakob Bertele (25 December 1900 – 16 November 1985) was a German optics constructor. His developments received universal recognition and serve as a basis for considerable part of the optical designs used today.

== Biography ==
Ludwig Jakob Bertele was born 25 December 1900 in Munich, to an architect's family.

=== At Ernemann ===
In 1916, Bertele was employed as the assistant of an optics designer at Rodenstock in Munich. In 1919, he moved to Dresden to work for Heinrich Ernemann at Ernemann Company (Krupp-Ernemann Kinoapparate AG) under the supervision of August Klughardt, as a designer of optics. In the same year, Bertele would begin the development of the Ernostar design. Its basis was the optical scheme of the Ultrastigmat cinema lens, a modified Cooke triplet, which had been developed by Charles C. Minor in 1916 and produced by Gundlach Company. The main purpose of Bertele's developmental work was to increase the light-gathering power of a lens as well as diminishing optical aberration.

In 1923, after four years of development, Bertele patented his first ultra high-aperture [objective?], the Ernostar f/2, with successive versions following in the years up to 1926. The lens was fitted to the Ermanox camera, which was specially developed for photo reportage. The Ermanox with Ernostar f/2 was the first camera with sufficient speed and image quality for successful candid photography in natural or otherwise unaltered light conditions. The pictures of prominent political figures taken using the lens by Erich Salomon are widely known. (Note: The Ernostar optical scheme serves as a basis for the Canon lens EF 135mm f/2.0 L.)

=== At Zeiss ===
After the foundation of Zeiss Ikon in 1926, as a result of integration of companies ICA, (Internationale Camera Actiengesellschaft) Optische Anstalt CP Goerz, Contessa-Nettel and Ernemann-Werke with Carl Zeiss, Bertele continued his work in Dresden except for a short trip to United States in 1929. An experimental optical workshop was given at Bertele's disposal, where he would develop and produce all examples and prototypes from his own calculations. Every lens was given a unique five-cipher number, and the current number of the variant was often engraved upon lenses.

In the late 1920s, Bertele began the development of a series of lenses based around the second Ernostar type, which was developed in 1924. Each lens had a single positive element in front of it, followed by a thick negative meniscus-shaped component, with a positive element behind. In 1931, the first example of such lenses appeared. It received the name Sonnar, derived from the German word sonne ("sun"). (Note: The name "Sonnar" had been used previously by the Contessa Company for one of their folding cameras, and for the Tessar-type lens fitted to it. After Contessa became part of Zeiss Ikon, the name Sonnar became Zeiss's property.) (Note: The Sonnar scheme was used in the Sony Carl Zeiss Sonnar T* 135/1.8 ZA lens, which is produced for Sony A-mount SLR cameras.) This lens consisted of seven elements in three groups, with a maximum aperture of f/2. The main difference from the previous Ernostar lens was a lesser number of optical groups, resulting in lesser light dispersion and a higher contrast. These lenses proved extraordinarily successful, and were appraised by specialists.

In 1932, a Sonnar variant with a faster maximum aperture of f/1.5 was developed, which was fitted to Zeiss Ikon's 35 mm Contax cameras. A number of versions of the Sonnar lens soon followed, with focal lengths from 50 to 300 mm developed until 1940.

Around 1934, Bertele, using the design of the f/1.5 Sonnar lens as a base, created the first wide-angle lens, the Biogon, with a 60° viewing angle; the original Biogon design was reused for the Wild Aviotar.

In 1935, Bertele developed the Sonnar 180mm/2.8, named the "Olympia Sonnar", after the 1936 Summer Olympics in Berlin. The lens produced high-quality images with bokeh.

Between 1943 and 1945, Bertele worked at Steinheil in Munich and Lustenau. The firm was employed by German weapons manufacturers under the auspices of the German Ministry of Aviation.

As Zeiss in Dresden and Jena had become part of the Soviet Zone of Occupation in 1945, they were required to transfer their designs, as well as their machinery and staff, for training in Russia and Ukraine, where Sonnars were produced in vast numbers under the "Jupiter" designation, as some of the most desirable optical products made in Soviet Russia. In comparison, the Zeiss branch of East and West Germany was tiny; Bertele was in absence at this time, but was known as the most significant optical designer of Soviet Russian optical products.

=== At Wild Heerbrugg ===
In 1946, Bertele moved to Switzerland, where he founded an optical bureau and began working at Wild Heerbrugg Company (now Leica Geosystems) in the field of photogrammetry and geodesic devices. In 1950, he created an aerial 90° viewing-angle f/4.5 lens, the Aviogon, which was free from optical aberrations; distortion was less than 10 μm at any point of the image field, and the lens produced high-resolution images. The new lens quickly replaced the Topogon and Metrogon as the standard lens for aerial photography and photogrammetry. This lens, as well as 120° Super Aviogon, which appeared in 1956, won a great number of prizes and merited general recognition.

In the same year, Bertele computed new optical designs for Carl Zeiss in Oberkochen, resulting in a Biogon lens with a 90° viewing-angle in 1954. This new design was the basis of a number of ultra wide-angle lenses, such as the Biogon f/4.5 21 mm (1954) for Contax; the Biogon f/4.5 38 mm (1954) for Hasselblad; the Biogon f/4.5 53 mm (1955) and the Biogon f/4.5 75 mm (1955) for Linhof. NASA used the Hasselblad Biogon to document Project Gemini (1965/66) and later the Apollo program (1968–72). In addition, Bertele developed objectives for Schacht, where he was assigned for the computation of ocular lenses, as well as the development of a number of other specialist products.

=== Retirement ===
Bertele left the firm in 1956, continuing his own research and giving consultations. In 1958, he was awarded the rank of Honorary Doctor of ETH Zurich. Bertele retired in 1973, but continued his work in optical development, receiving worldwide patents for lens designs as late as 1976-78 and applying for a German patent in 1983.

Bertele resided in the small town of Wildhaus in the canton of St. Gallen in Switzerland in his later years. He died on 16 November 1985.

== Bibliography ==
- Hartmut Thiele. Entwicklung und Beschreibung der Photoobjektive und ihre Erfinder; Carl Zeiss Jena, 2. Auflage mit erweiterten Tabellen, Privatdruck München 2007.
- Rudolf Kingslake. A history of photographic lens. Academic Press ISBN 0-12-408640-3, San Diego, USA 1989.

=== Patents ===
- GB 191702, Ludwig Bertele, "Photographic Lens", issued March 8, 1923
- DE 401274, Ludwig Bertele, "Photographisches Objektiv", issued August 30, 1924
- US 1584271, Ludwig Bertele, "Photographic Lens", issued May 11, 1926
- GB 383591, Ludwig Bertele, "Improvements in or relating to Optical Objectives", issued November 17, 1932
- DE 570983, Ludwig Bertele, "Photographisches Objektiv", issued February 21, 1933
- US 1998704, Ludwig Bertele, "Photographic Objective", issued April 23, 1935
