= Sigma 4.5mm f/2.8 EX DC Circular Fisheye HSM lens =

Fisheye lens for APS-C cameras

Sigma 4.5mm f/2.8 EX DC circular fisheye
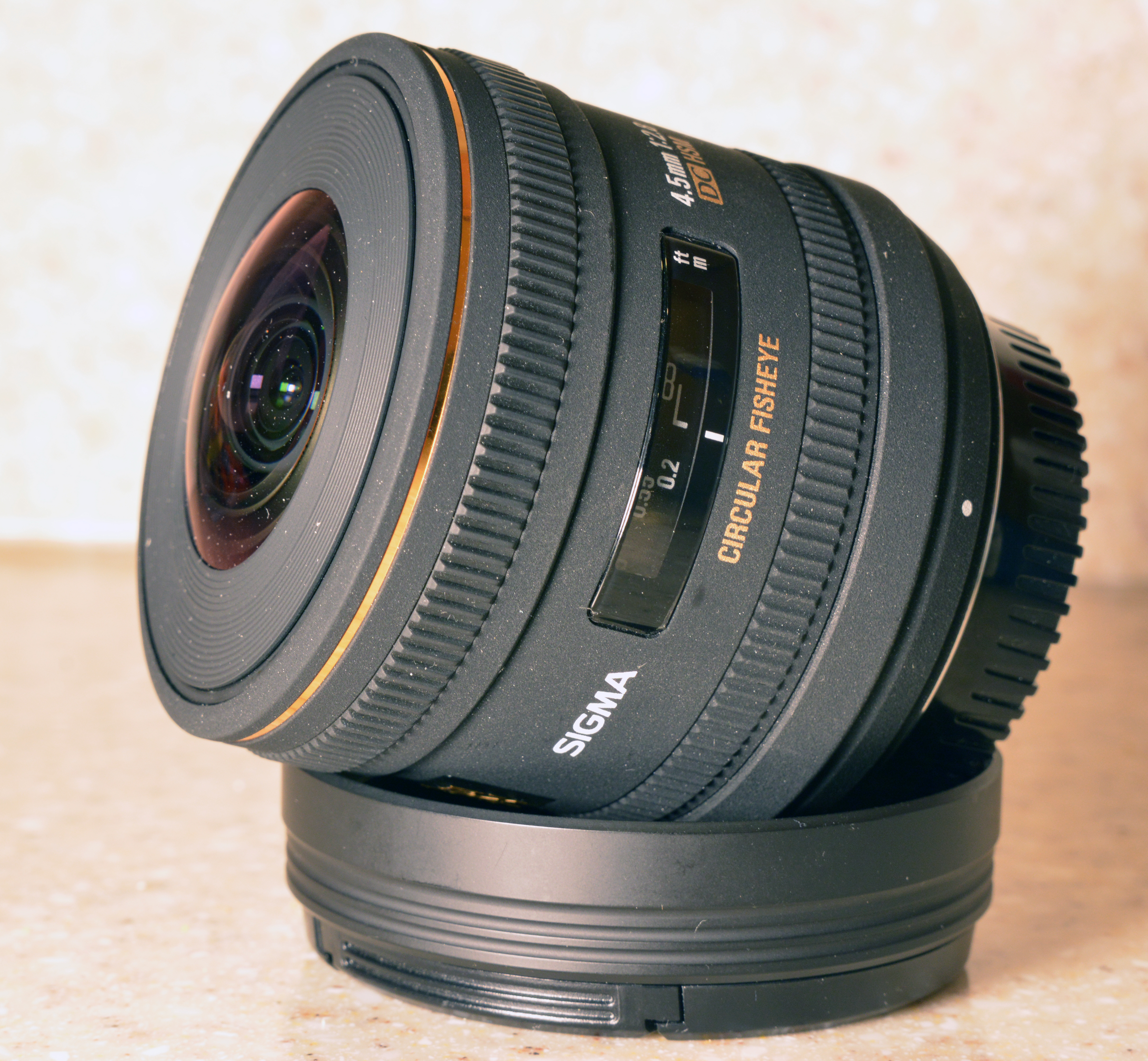
- Maker: Sigma Corporation

Technical data
- Type: circular fisheye lens
- Focus drive: Ultrasonic motor
- Focal length: 4.5mm
- Crop factor: 180 degrees
- Aperture (max/min): f/2.8
- Close focus distance: 13.5cm
- Max. magnification: 1:6
- Diaphragm blades: 6
- Construction: 13 elements in 9 groups

Features
- Short back focus: No No
- Lens-based stabilization: No No
- Macro capable: No No
- Unique features: circular fisheye

Physical
- Max. length: 77.8mm
- Diameter: 76.2mm
- Weight: 470g (16.6oz)
- Filter diameter: rear (Gelatin filter)

Accessories
- Lens hood: none

Angle of view
- Horizontal: 180
- Vertical: 180
- Diagonal: 180

Retail info
- MSRP: 1400 USD

The Sigma 4.5mm f/2.8 EX DC circular fisheye is a photographic lens manufactured by Sigma Corporation. It is a circular fisheye lens, designed to project a 180-degree field of view in all directions onto a circular image. It is the first such lens to provide the complete circular fisheye effect on crop factor digital SLR cameras, which do not have a full 36x24mm sensor. This lens is available in Canon, Nikon, Sigma, Pentax and Sony mounts.

This lens projects a 13mm image circle, which fits nicely in a Micro Four Thirds system frame with an adapter.

== See also ==
- List of Nikon compatible lenses with integrated autofocus-motor
- Sigma 10mm f/2.8 EX DC Fisheye HSM lens
