= Sony Alpha 550 =

2009 APS-C digital single-lens reflex camera

Sony α 550
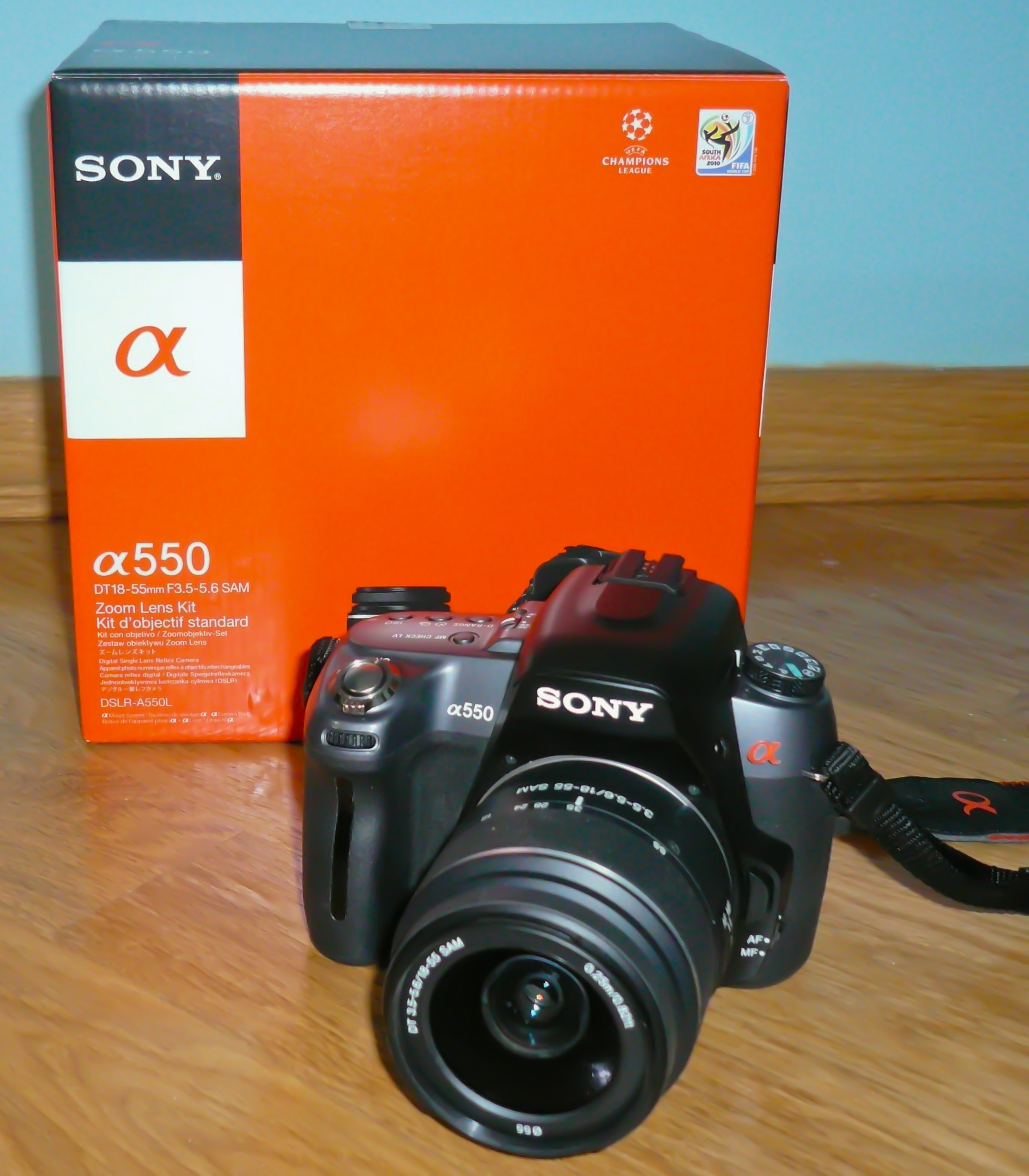

Overview
- Maker: Sony Group
- Type: Digital single-lens reflex camera

Lens
- Lens: Sony mount; compatible with Minolta A-type bayonet mount. Sony α Lens and Konica Minolta α/MAXXUM/DYNAX Lens

Sensor/medium
- Sensor: 23.4 x 15.6 mm APS-C Type CMOS Exmor Sensor, 14.6 million total pixels 14.2 million effective pixels
- Maximum resolution: 4592 x 3056 pixels
- Film speed: Auto, 200, 400, 800, 1600, 3200, 6400, 12800
- Storage media: Secure Digital/Secure Digital HC, Memory Stick PRO Duo

Exposure/metering
- Exposure metering: Multi-segment (40 segment Honeycomb pattern)/ Center-weighted/ Spot

Flash
- Flash: Manual Pop-up: Auto, Fill-flash, Slow sync., Rear flash sync, Wireless off camera flash

Shutter
- Shutter: Electronically controlled, vertical-traverse, focal-plane Shutter
- Shutter speed range: 30 to 1/4000 sec, with Bulb mode.
- Continuous shooting: Up to 7 frame/s max in Speed- Priority mode.

Viewfinder
- Viewfinder: Eye-level fixed optical glass pentamirror

Image processing
- White balance: Auto, daylight, shade, cloudy, Tungsten, fluorescent, flash, color temperature, custom
- WB bracketing: 3 exposures - Hi / Lo level selectable

General
- LCD screen: 3.0 TFT Xtra Fine LCD/ 921,600 dots
- Battery: NP-FM500H Lithium-Ion rechargeable battery (1650 mAh)
- Weight: No battery: 599 g (1.5lb)
- Made in: Japan

The Sony Alpha a550 (DSLR-A550) is a midrange-level digital single-lens reflex camera (DSLR) marketed by Sony and aimed at enthusiasts, it was released in August 2009. The camera features a 14.2 megapixel APS-C Type CMOS Exmor Sensor and features Sony's patented SteadyShot INSIDE stabilisation system which works with any attached lens. The Sony Alpha a550's main selling point is its dual Live View mode's, Sony's normal secondary; smaller sensor based Live View mode and another which uses the main sensor with no autofocus. The a550 also features a maximum of 7frame/s continuous shooting speed when operating in speed-priority mode and a maximum ISO of 1600 when in auto mode and 12800 ISO when in manual mode.

The Sony Alpha a550 is "big brother" to the Sony Alpha a500, an almost identical DSLR with a smaller 12.3 megapixel APS-C CMOS sensor, no 7frame/s continuous shooting and a lower resolution LCD.

== Live View ==
The a550 stands out from other DSLR's in its price range with its use of 2 separate Live View modes. The first mode operates in the same way other DSLR's do, by switching from using the main sensor to using a secondary, smaller sensor. This allows the a550 to autofocus in its first Live View mode. However, this only provides a 90% view of the final image the main sensor will take. The second Live View mode is named Manual Focus Check Live View. This mode uses the main 14.2 megapixel APS-C Type CMOS Exmor Sensor to provide a 100% view on the rear LCD. This mode does not allow auto focusing, hence the name Manual Focus Check Live View. When in Live View mode the a550 uses its 3.0 TFT Xtra Fine LCD, with 921,600 dots which can be adjusted to point downwards, for overhead shooting or upwards for below eye level shooting. When Live View mode is not in use the optical viewfinder (OVF) is used and only provides 95% coverage of the actual image taken by the sensor.

== CMOS sensor ==
The a550 uses a 14.2 megapixel APS-C Type CMOS Exmor Sensor. It is a 23.4 x 15.6 mm APS-C Type CMOS Exmor Sensor with an RGB Color Filter Array, Built-in fixed low-pass filter, with 14.6 million total pixels and 14.2 million effective pixels.

This sensor is capable of recording in 5 different File qualities / formats : • RAW (.ARW) • RAW + JPEG Fine • RAW + JPEG Standard • JPEG Fine • JPEG Standard and in 6 different image sizes; 3:2 • 4592 x 3056 (L) • 3344 x 2224 (M) • 2288 x 1520 (S) 16:9 • 4592 x 2576 (L) • 3344 x 1872 (M) • 2288 x 1280 (S)

=== Sony A550 Anti-Dust Technology ===
To help combat dust particles on the sensor from changing lenses, Sony included both an anti-static coating on the sensor filter and anti-dust vibrations to automatically shake the sensor with the anti-shake mechanism each time the camera is shut off. There is also a manual cleaning mode, where the camera first shakes the sensor, then lifts the mirror and opens the shutter, allowing access to the sensor for use with a blower or other cleaning device.

== Sony A550 Autofocus ==
The Sony A550 provides both manual and automatic focus control modes, set by the Focus Mode switch on the left side of the camera body, or on the lens. The Function button provides access to additional AF modes and AF Area options. The Autofocus Mode option under the Function menu offers Single-shot AF (AF-S), Automatic AF (AF-A), and Continuous AF (AF-C) settings. Single-shot AF acquires and locks focus when the shutter button is half-pressed, while Continuous AF mode constantly adjusts focus while the shutter button is half-pressed. The Automatic AF setting will lock focus on a still subject, but will switch to Continuous AF mode if the subject moves.

Autofocus Area has three options available through the Function menu: Wide, Spot, and Local (manual setting). The default option is a nine-point Wide Focus area, where the camera selects which of the nine focus points is used. (Note that only the center point utilized a cross-type sensor sensitive to detail in both the horizontal and vertical axis. The other 8 sensors are line-type, sensitive to detail in one direction only, although the four line sensors at the corners of the AF array are angled, so they'll respond to both horizontal and vertical detail.)

You can override the chosen AF mode by pressing the AF button in the center of the Multi-controller on the camera's rear panel, which will select the center AF point (the latter indicated by the target box in the center of the viewfinder). Wide AF bases its focus on the most prominent subject detail in the portion of the image that falls within the total AF area. Spot mode bases its focus on the AF point at very center of the frame. The Local setting is Sony's terminology for a manual AF area selection, and lets you manually set the main AF point by using the Multi-controller to highlight one of the nine AF points. The active AF area is briefly illuminated in the viewfinder during autofocus.

== SteadyShot Stabilization ==
The Sony Alpha a550 incorporates Sony's patented SteadyShot INSIDE stabilization system which works with any attached lens. This uses a CCD-Shift system which moves the entire sensor platform in two axes. Sony claims the system is good for between 2.5 and 4 stops of compensation depending on the lens and shooting conditions, and like the entry-level Alphas it’s enabled or disabled from a menu option rather than with the physical switch of earlier models.

Level	Sensor	2004	2005	2006	2007	2008	2009	2010	2011		2012	2013	2014	2015	2016	2017	2018	2019	2020
Professional	Full frame						α900					α99				α99 II			
Professional	Full frame							α850											
High-end	APS-C		DG-7D			α700				α77				α77 II					
Midrange	APS-C									α65					α68				
Upper-entry	APS-C								α55		α57								
Upper-entry	APS-C				α100			α550 ^{F}	α580				α58						
Upper-entry	APS-C		DG-5D					α500	α560										
Upper-entry	APS-C							α450											
Entry-level	APS-C								α33	α35	α37								
Entry-level	APS-C					α350 ^{F}		α380	α390										
Entry-level	APS-C					α300		α330											
Entry-level	APS-C					α200		α230	α290										
Early models	Minolta 7000 with SB-70/SB-70S (1986) · Minolta 9000 with SB-90/SB-90S (1986) (Still video SLRs); Minolta MS-C1100 (1992) · Minolta RD-175 (1995)																		
Level	Sensor																		
Level	Sensor	2004	2005	2006	2007	2008	2009	2010	2011		2012	2013	2014	2015	2016	2017	2018	2019	2020
