= Sigma 10mm f/2.8 EX DC Fisheye HSM lens =

Photographic lens

Sigma 10mm f/2.8 EX DC HSM fisheye
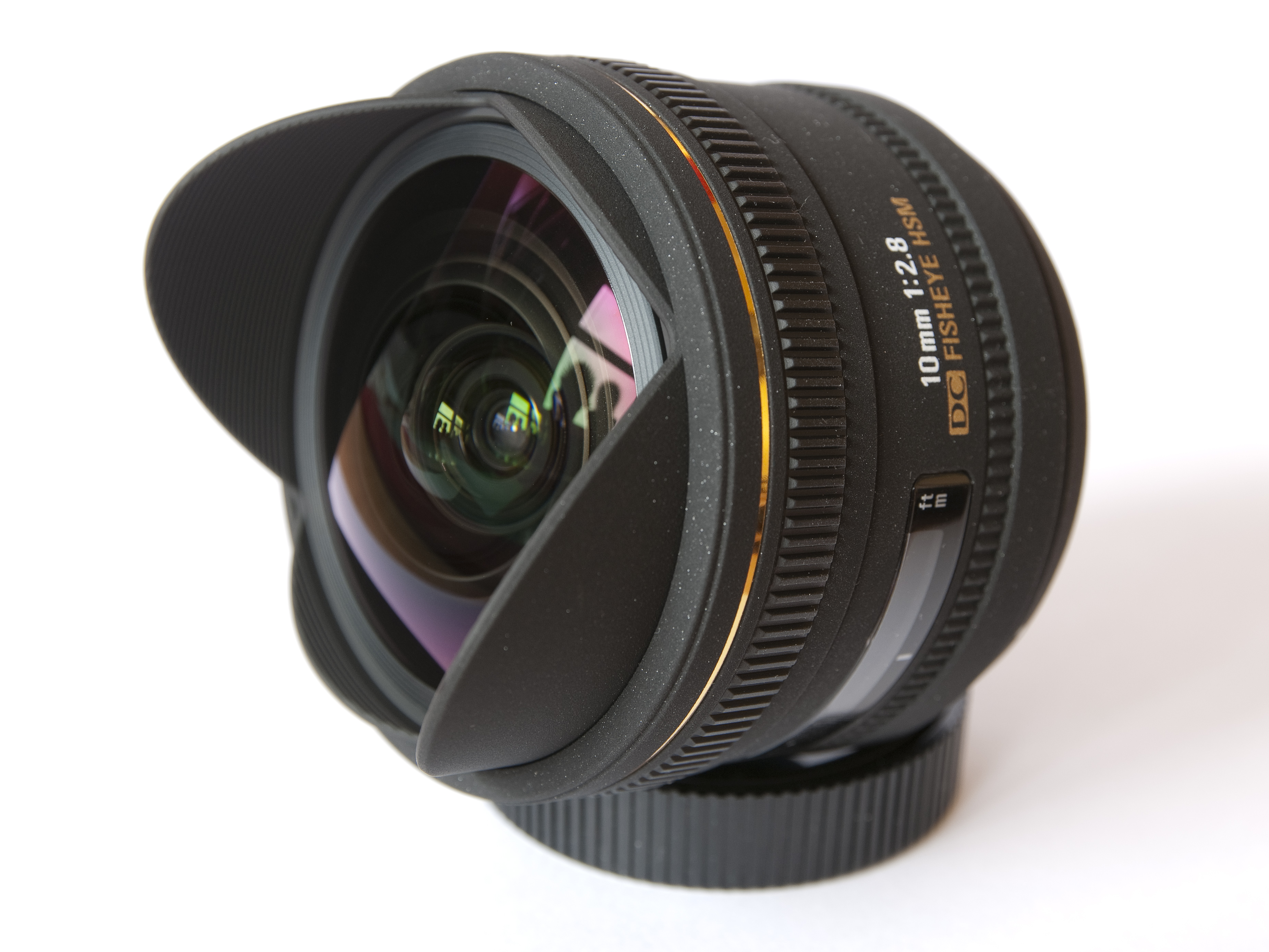
- Maker: Sigma Corporation

Technical data
- Type: diagonal fisheye lens
- Focal length: 10mm
- Crop factor: Varies by sensor size
- Aperture (max/min): f/2.8 - f/22
- Close focus distance: 13.5cm
- Max. magnification: 1:3.3
- Diaphragm blades: 7
- Construction: 12 elements in 7 groups

Features
- Short back focus: No No
- Ultrasonic motor: Yes Yes
- Lens-based stabilization: No No
- Macro capable: No No
- Unique features: fisheye

Physical
- Max. length: 83.1mm
- Diameter: 75.8mm
- Weight: 475g (16.8oz)
- Filter diameter: rear (Gelatin filter)

Accessories
- Lens hood: built-in petal

Angle of view
- Diagonal: 180° (Sony Alpha, Nikon D), 157° (Sigma SD), 167° (Canon)

History
- Introduction: Nov. 2007

Retail info
- MSRP: 1000 USD

The Sigma 10mm f/2.8 EX DC fisheye is a photographic lens manufactured by Sigma Corporation. It is a diagonal fisheye lens. Unlike most fisheye lenses, this lens is designed for digital SLR cameras that do not have a full 36x24mm sensor. This results in a much greater fisheye effect than is possible when a full-frame fisheye lens is used with a smaller sensor. The projection type of this lens is equidistant.

This lens is available in Canon, Nikon, and Sigma, Pentax, and Sony mounts.

== Gallery ==
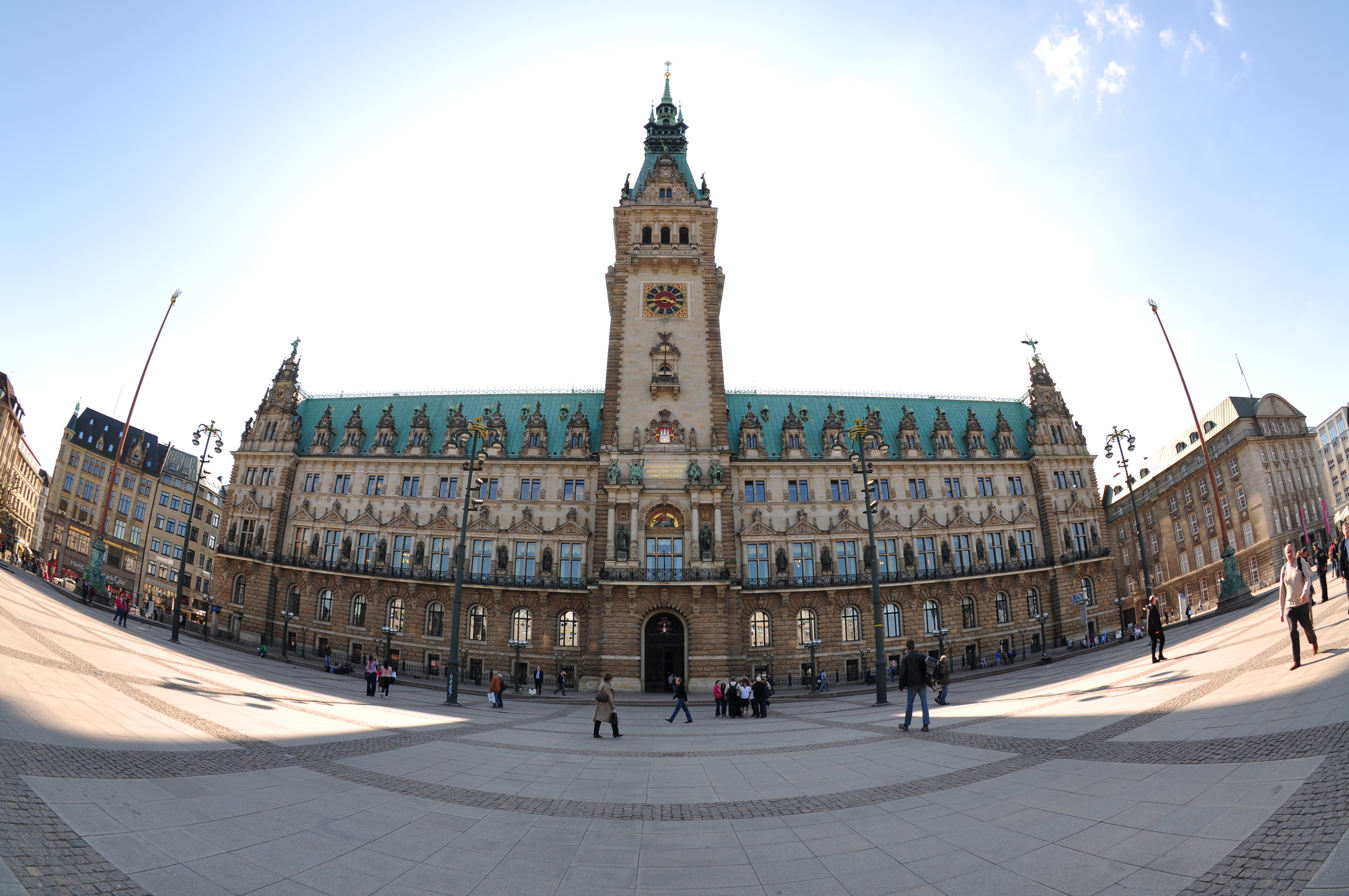
Town-hall of Hamburg

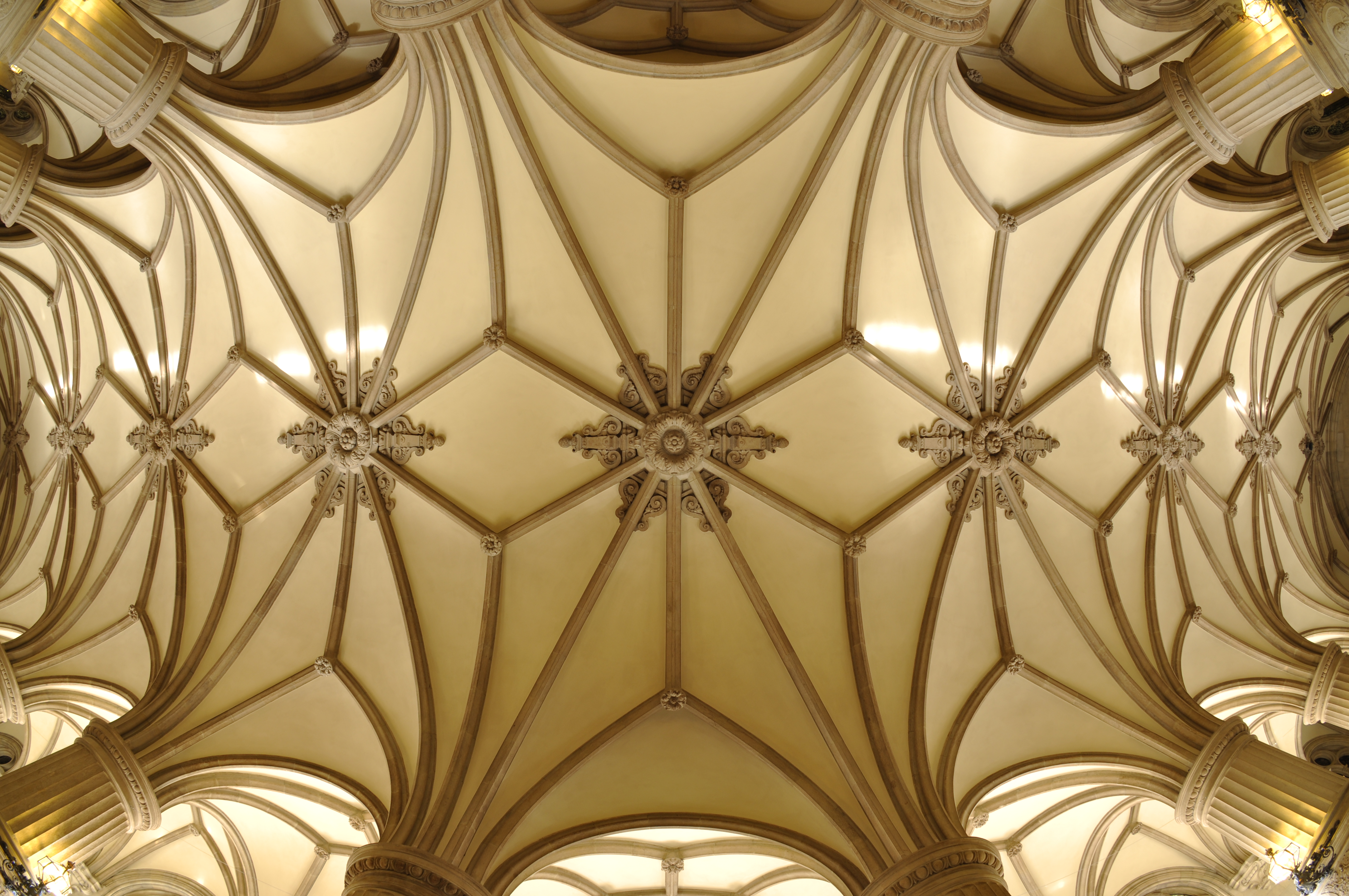
Ceiling of Hamburg's Town-hall

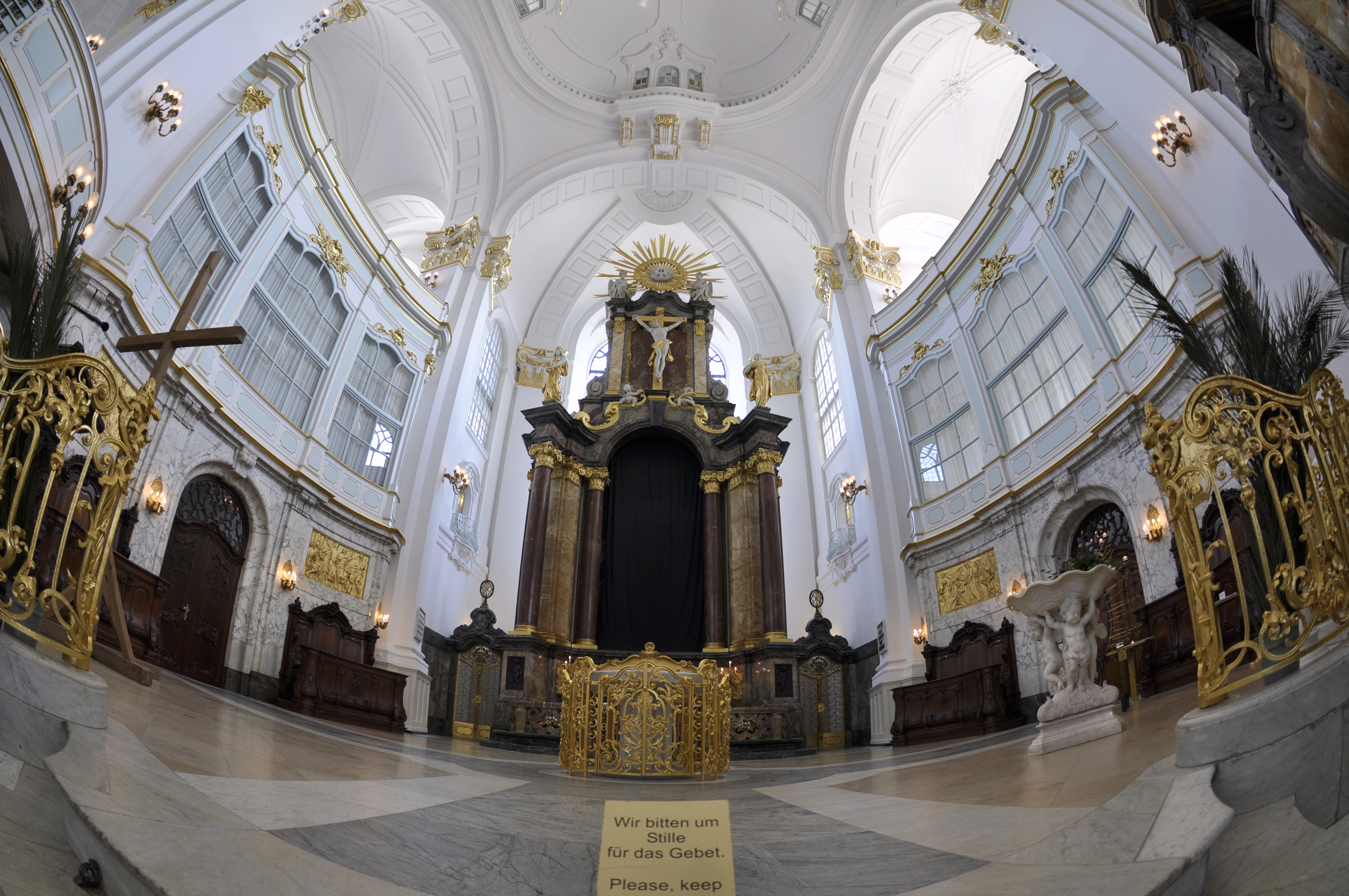
St. Michael's Church, Hamburg

== See also ==
- List of Nikon compatible lenses with integrated autofocus-motor
- Sigma 4.5mm f/2.8 EX DC Circular Fisheye HSM lens
