= Sony α Carl Zeiss Vario-Sonnar T* DT 16-80mm f/3.5-4.5 ZA =

Zoom lens for photographic cameras

Carl Zeiss Vario-Sonnar T* DT 16-80mm F3.5–4.5 ZA
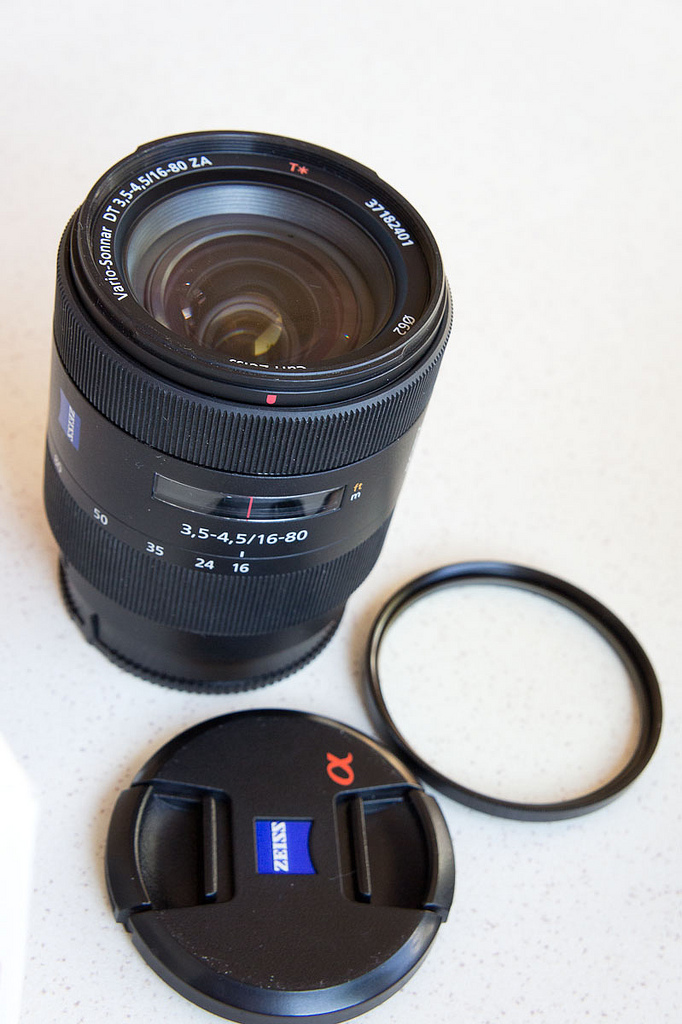
- Maker: Sony, Carl Zeiss

Technical data
- Type: Zoom
- Focal length: 16-80mm
- Aperture (max/min): f/3.5 – f/22
- Close focus distance: 0.35 m
- Max. magnification: 0.24x
- Diaphragm blades: 7 circular
- Construction: 14 elements in 10 groups

Features
- Ultrasonic motor: No

Physical
- Max. length: 122 mm
- Diameter: 72 mm
- Weight: 445 g
- Filter diameter: 62 mm

Accessories
- Lens hood: Composite Metal-plastic bayonet-mount flower

History
- Introduction: 2007

Retail info
- MSRP: 700 USD

The Vario-Sonnar T* DT 16–80 mm f/3.5-4.5 ZA (SAL-1680Z) is a high-quality zoom lens compatible with cameras using the Sony α, and Minolta AF lens mounts. It was designed and is manufactured by Sony in Japan in collaboration with Carl Zeiss.

The lens is designed specifically for use with APS-C sized image sensors, and thus will result in vignetting on 35 mm (full frame) cameras. When the 1.5× crop factor of current Sony digital single-lens reflex cameras is considered, the lens has an effective equivalent 24–120 mm focal length.

== See also ==
- Zeiss Vario-Sonnar

== Sources ==
- Dyxum lens data
