= Sony Alpha 500 =

Sony α 500
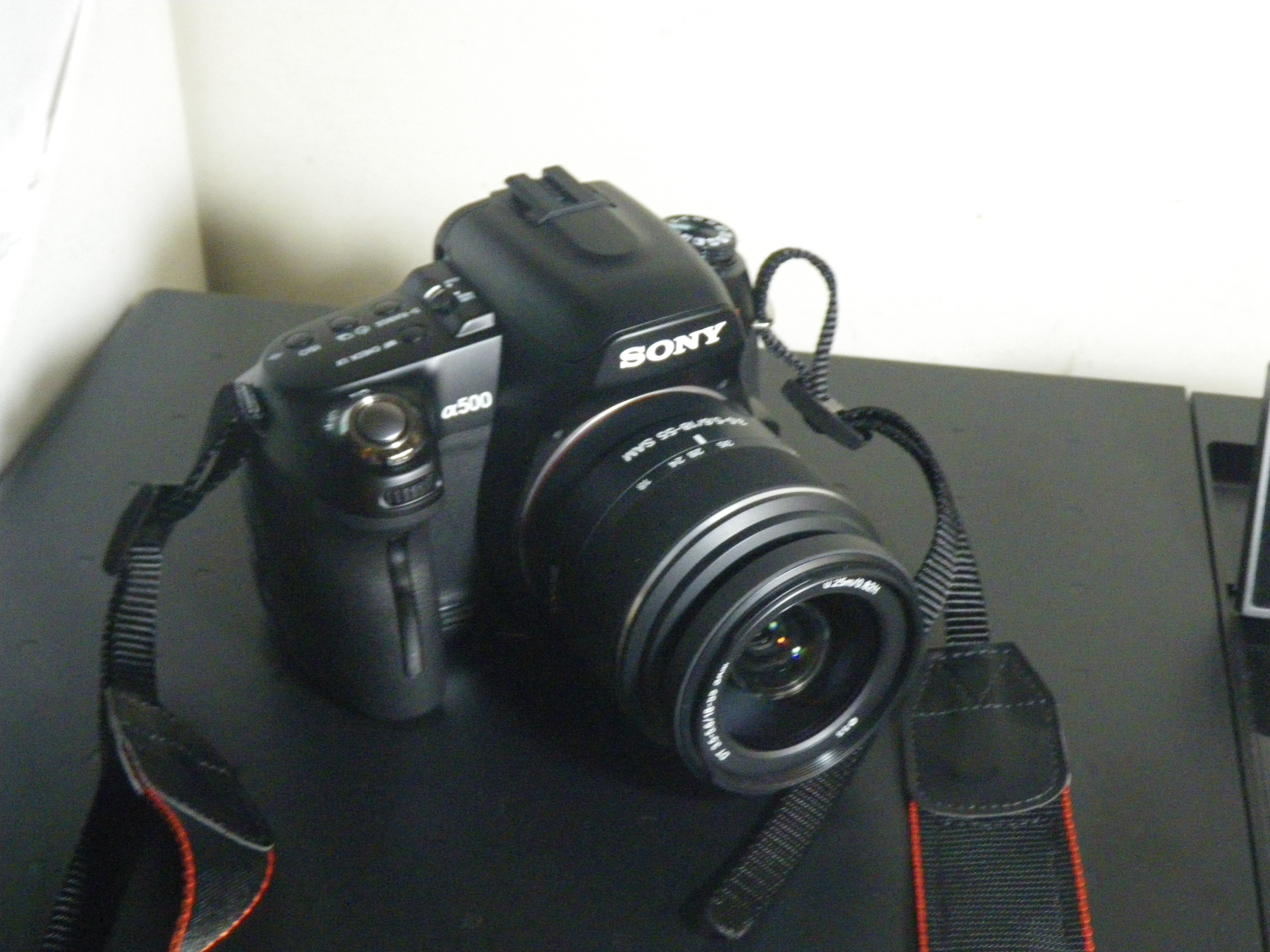

Overview
- Maker: Sony Group
- Type: Digital single-lens reflex camera

Lens
- Lens: interchangeable, Sony α / Konica Minolta A mount

Sensor/medium
- Sensor: 23.5 mm × 15.6 mm APS-C 12.3 effective megapixels CMOS
- Maximum resolution: 4272 × 2848 pixels
- Film speed: Auto, 200, 400, 800, 1600, 3200, 6400, 12800
- Storage media: Secure Digital/Secure Digital HC, Memory Stick PRO Duo

Exposure/metering
- Metering modes: Multi-segment, Center-weighted, Spot

Flash
- Flash: Manual Pop-up: Auto, Fill-flash, Slow sync., Rear flash sync, Wireless off camera flash

Shutter
- Shutter: electronically controlled, vertical-traverse, focal-plane Shutter
- Shutter speed range: 30–1/4000 sec, with Bulb, 1/160 sec X-sync
- Continuous shooting: 5 Frames Per Second, 4 Frames Per Second in LiveView

Viewfinder
- Viewfinder: optical

Image processing
- White balance: Auto, daylight, shade, cloudy, Tungsten, fluorescent, flash, color temperature, custom
- WB bracketing: 5 frames

General
- LCD screen: 230k pixel 3-inch TFT LCD
- Battery: 7.2 V, 1650 mAh (Sony NP-FM500H)
- Weight: 597 g (21.1 oz) (body only)
- Made in: Japan

The Sony α 500 (DSLR-A500) is a midrange-level digital single-lens reflex camera (DSLR) marketed by Sony, which was released in 2009.

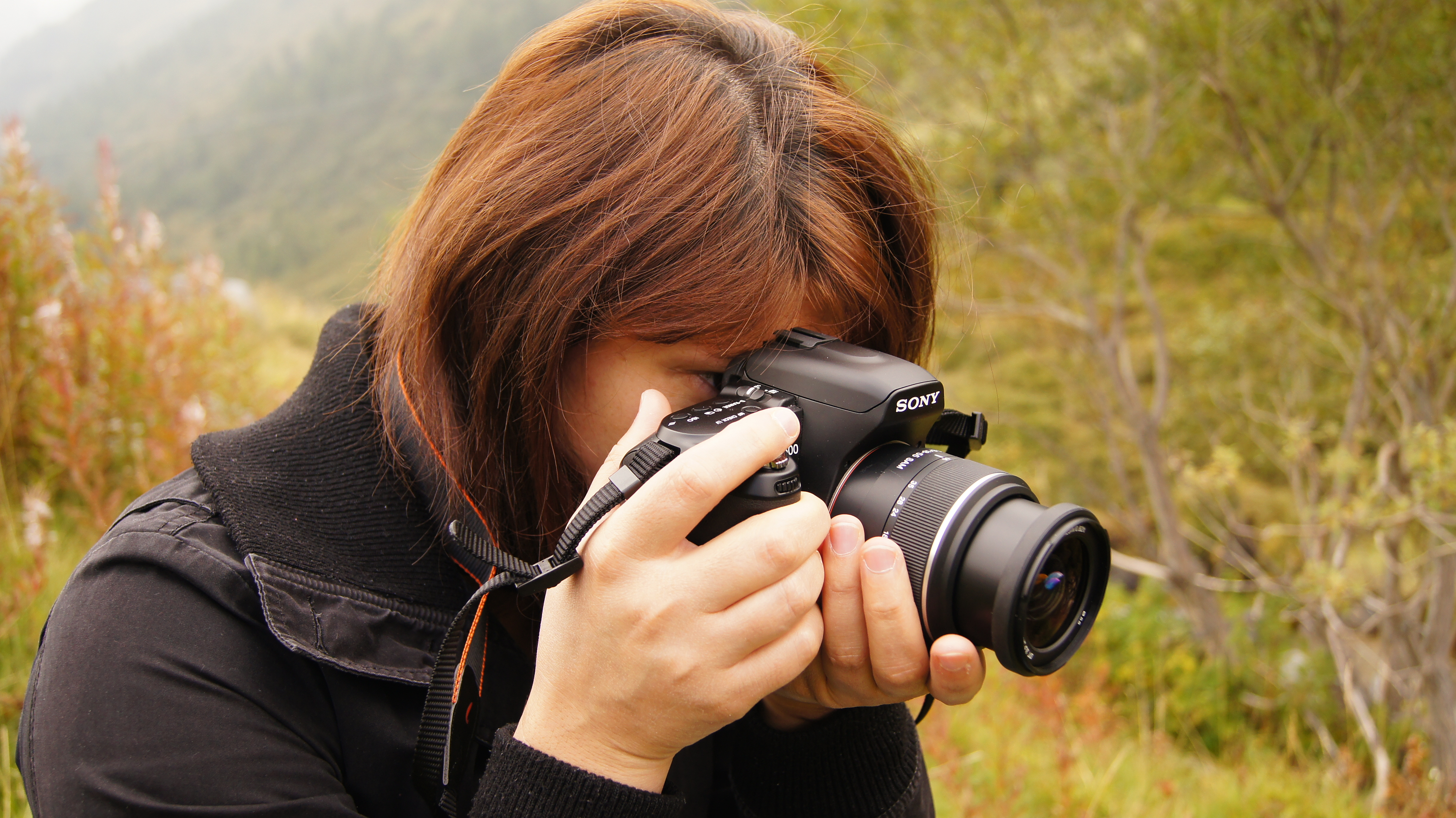
Sony a500 with a standard 18-55mm lens kit

It features live view and body-integrated image stabilization. It has a 12.3 megapixel APS-C CMOS sensor. The camera itself received mostly good reviews, with its fast continuous shot function, much better image quality for photos taken in bad light situations compared to 3xx series and overall very good price/performance ratio. Inability to record videoclips, is the mostly often criticized point.

Compared to A550, A500 features less detailed LiveView LCD, 12 contra 14 MPixel sensor resolution and absence of 7 frame/s continuous shot without autofocus mode. Both cameras also feature unique auto-HDR mode.

Level	Sensor	2004	2005	2006	2007	2008	2009	2010	2011		2012	2013	2014	2015	2016	2017	2018	2019	2020
Professional	Full frame						α900					α99				α99 II			
Professional	Full frame							α850											
High-end	APS-C		DG-7D			α700				α77				α77 II					
Midrange	APS-C									α65					α68				
Upper-entry	APS-C								α55		α57								
Upper-entry	APS-C				α100			α550 ^{F}	α580				α58						
Upper-entry	APS-C		DG-5D					α500	α560										
Upper-entry	APS-C							α450											
Entry-level	APS-C								α33	α35	α37								
Entry-level	APS-C					α350 ^{F}		α380	α390										
Entry-level	APS-C					α300		α330											
Entry-level	APS-C					α200		α230	α290										
Early models	Minolta 7000 with SB-70/SB-70S (1986) · Minolta 9000 with SB-90/SB-90S (1986) (Still video SLRs); Minolta MS-C1100 (1992) · Minolta RD-175 (1995)																		
Level	Sensor																		
Level	Sensor	2004	2005	2006	2007	2008	2009	2010	2011		2012	2013	2014	2015	2016	2017	2018	2019	2020
