= Sony α Carl Zeiss Sonnar T* 135mm f/1.8 ZA =

Carl Zeiss Sonnar T* 135mm F1.8 ZA
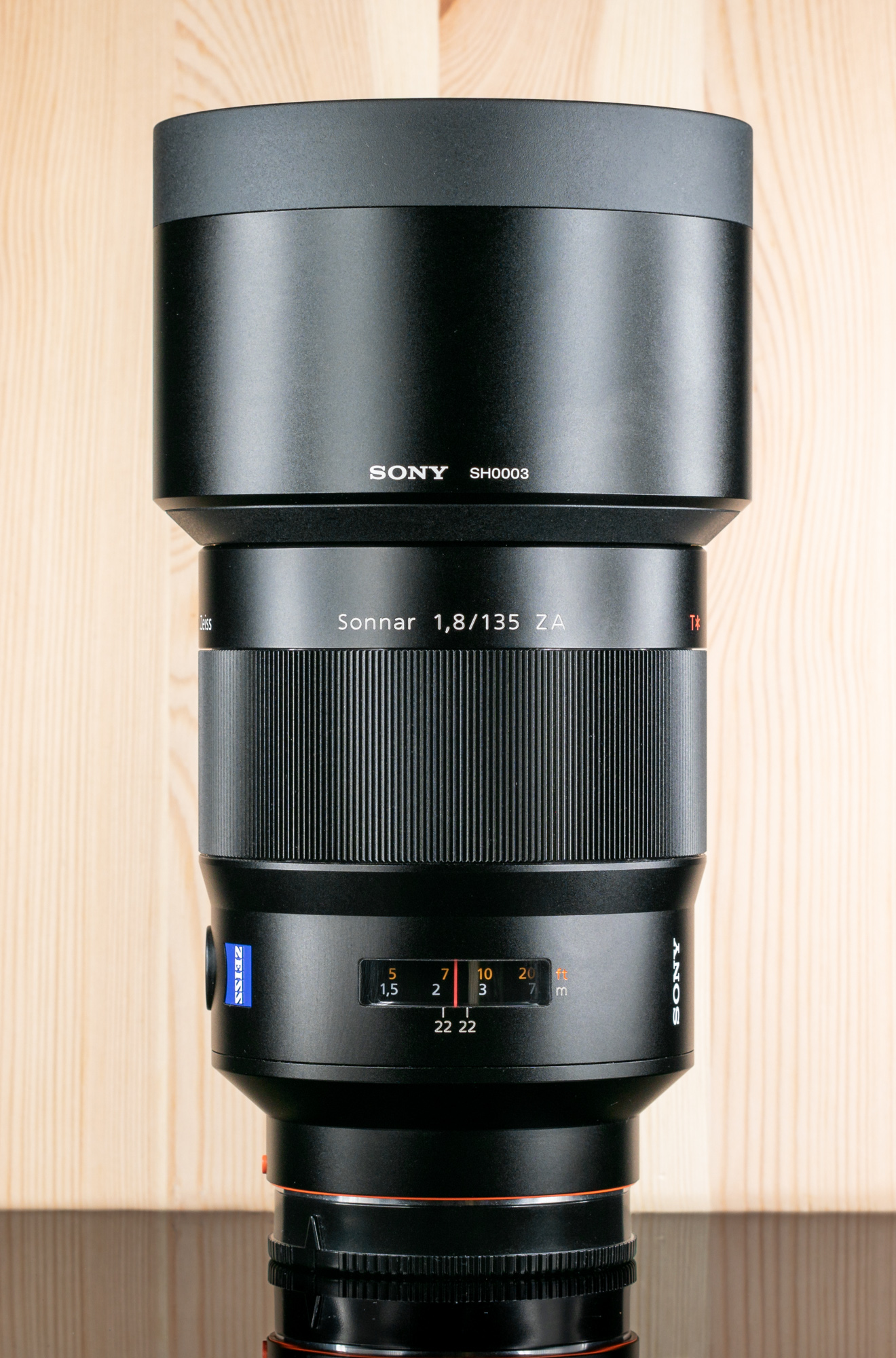
- Maker: Sony, Carl Zeiss

Technical data
- Type: Prime
- Focal length: 135 mm
- Crop factor: 18°
- Aperture (max/min): f/1.8 - f/22
- Close focus distance: 720 mm
- Max. magnification: 0.25x
- Diaphragm blades: 9 circular
- Construction: 11 elements in 9 groups

Features
- Ultrasonic motor: No

Physical
- Max. length: 115 mm
- Diameter: 88.5 mm
- Weight: 1050 g
- Filter diameter: 77 mm

Accessories
- Lens hood: Metal bayonet

Angle of view
- Horizontal: 18°

History
- Introduction: 2007

Retail info
- MSRP: 1400 USD

The Sonnar T* 135 mm f/1.8 ZA (SAL-135F18Z) is a high-quality wide-aperture prime telephoto lens compatible with cameras using the Sony α lens mount. It was designed and is manufactured by Sony in Japan in collaboration with Zeiss.

The lens is also compatible with cameras using the predecessor Minolta AF lens mount, however some Minolta SLR cameras will claim an aperture of f/1.7 when the lens is in fact only capable of f/1.8.

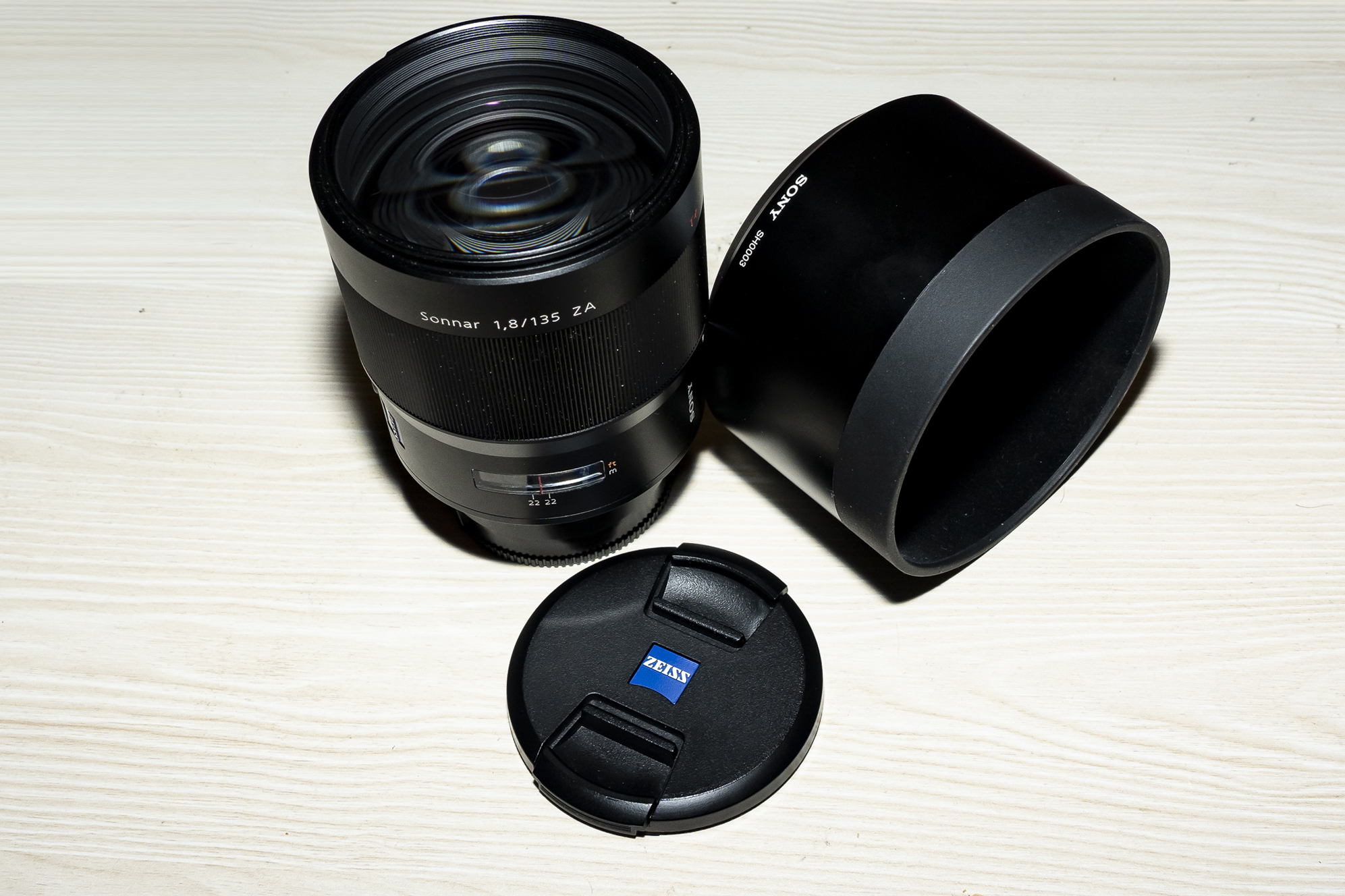
Sony A Zeiss 135mm f1.8 ZA lens with lens cap and SH0003 lens hood

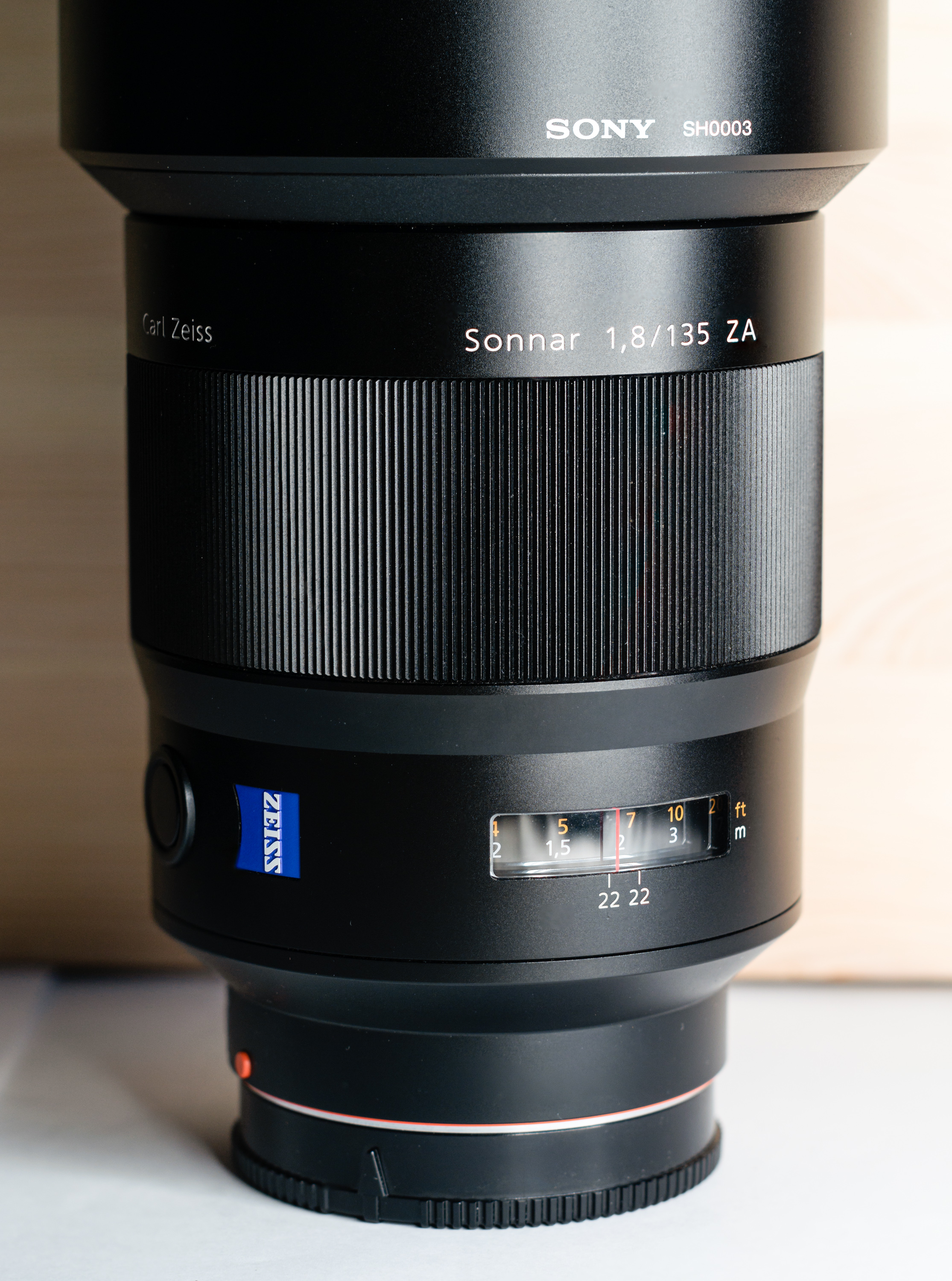

== See also ==
- Zeiss Sonnar

== Sources ==
- Dyxum lens data
