= Sony α =

Digital camera brand

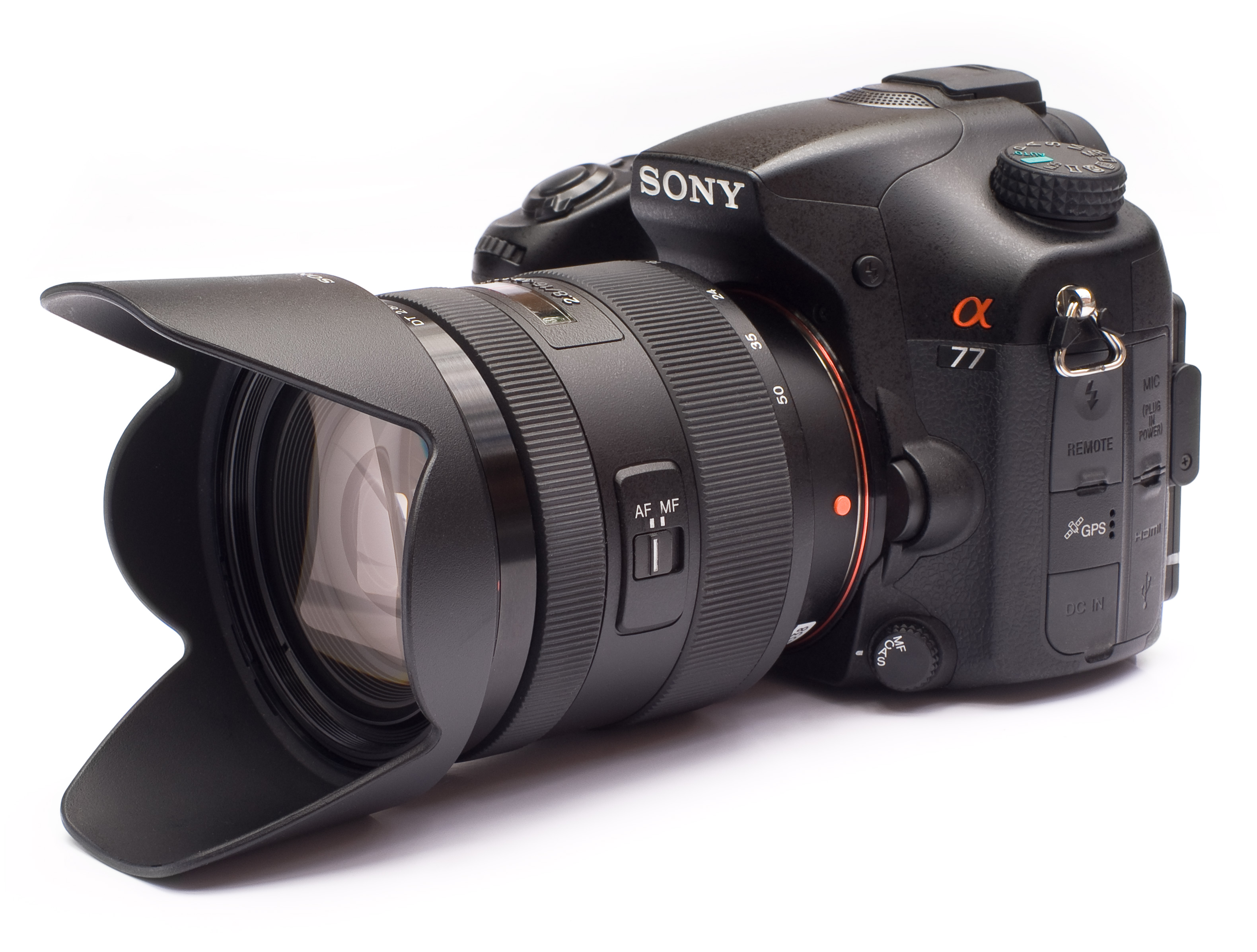
- Sony Alpha 77 (2011)
- Company type: Brand name used by Sony for their line of DSLR/SLT/ILCA/NEX/ILCE cameras
- Founded: Tokyo, Japan (2006)
- Headquarters: Konan, Minato-ku, Tokyo, Japan
- Products: Lenses, camera bodies

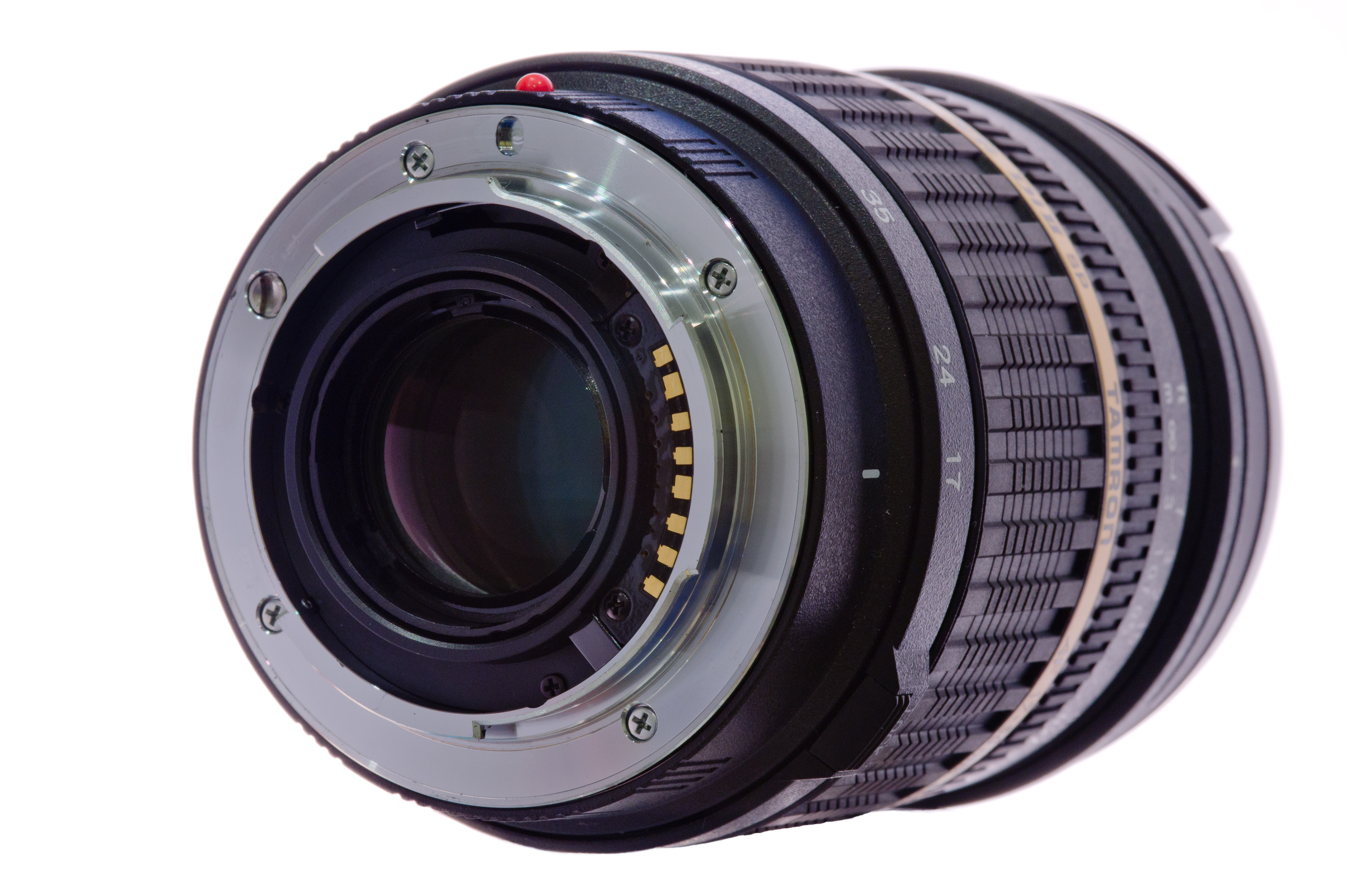
The Sony A-mount on a Tamron SP 17-50mm F2.8.

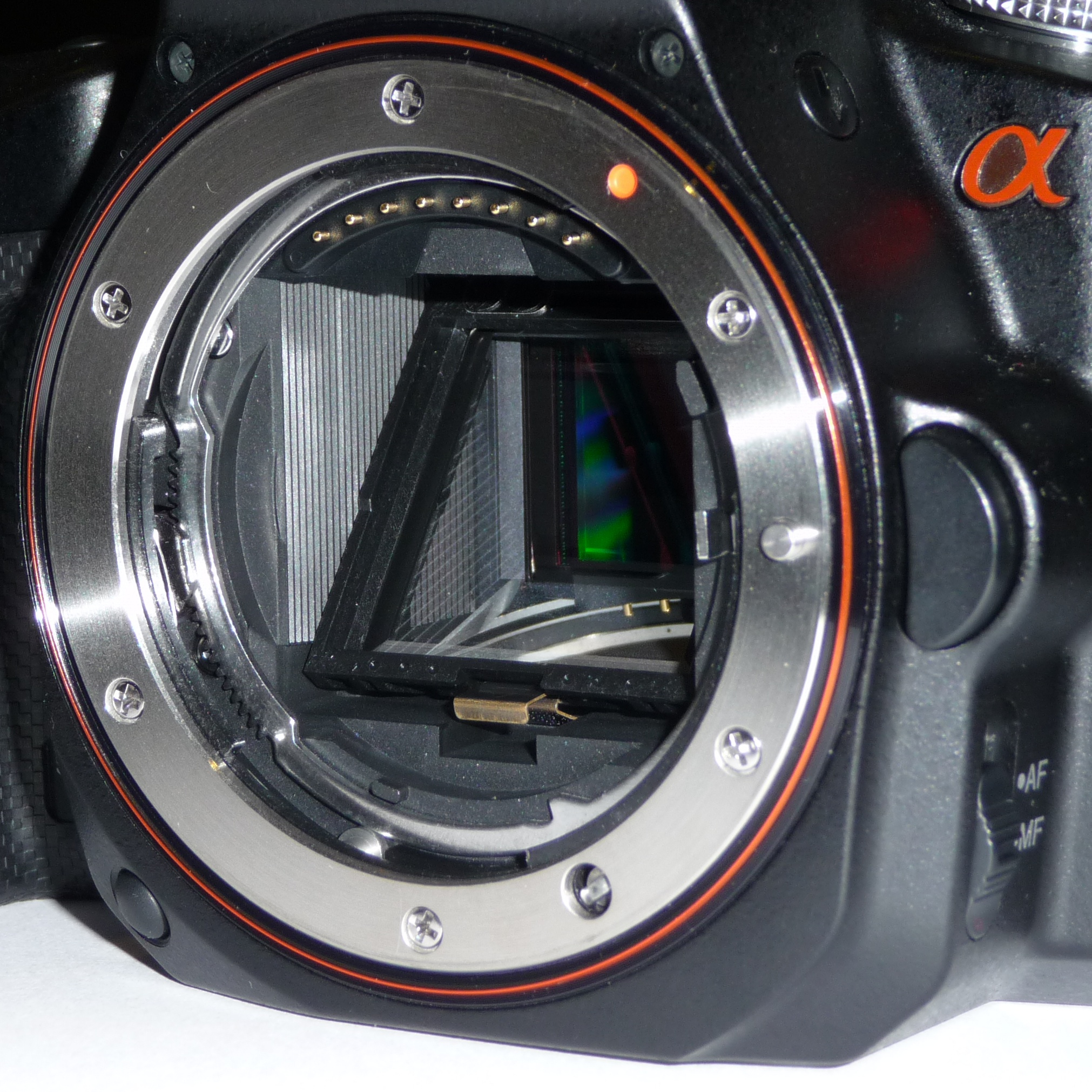
The Sony A-mount on an α33 camera.

Sony α (the lower case Greek letter alpha, often transliterated as Sony Alpha) is a brand of digital camera. This line has been active since 2006, building upon the Konica Minolta camera technologies, whose assets were acquired by Sony.

== Overview ==
Sony Alpha was introduced on 5 June 2006. It builds on existing Konica Minolta technologies including the Minolta AF SLR lens mount, whose assets were acquired by Sony after the end of Konica Minolta's photography operations in early 2006. Sony also has an 11.08% ownership stake in Japanese lens manufacturer Tamron, which is known to have partnered with Konica Minolta and Sony in the design and manufacture of many zoom lenses.

Prior to the acquisition by Sony, the α branding had already been used on the Japanese market by Minolta for their AF camera system (marketed as "Dynax" in Europe, and "Maxxum" in North America). Sony adopted the name "A-mount system" for the Minolta AF lens mount, which has been retained in their new SLR range.

Sony's entry into the DSLR market dates back to July 2005 where a joint venture with Konica Minolta would have resulted in both companies marketing an updated line of DSLRs to consumers. Between 2006 and 2008 Sony was the fastest growing company on the DSLR market, reaching 13% market share in 2008 to become the third largest DSLR company in the world.

Sony announced plans to introduce a special camera service programme for professional photographers since the launch of the α900 in 2008. Sony Imaging PRO Support (a.k.a. SPS) was finally established starting between 2013 and 2015 depending on country.

== Camera bodies ==
The Sony α model system follows a straightforward principle: each model in the series builds upon the features of its predecessor. For instance, the α330 incorporates all the capabilities of the base model α230 but adds a tilt-angle LCD and Quick AF Live View. Moving up the series, the α380 inherits the settings of the α330 but boasts an increased resolution of 14.2 megapixels.

Only a few Sony APS-C DSLRs have Live View, except for the Sony α100, α200, α230, α290, α700, α850 and α900 series. Live View mode offers a 1.4x or 2x Smart Teleconverter, digitally zooming in on the subject while maintaining a 1:1 pixel reproduction ratio. This innovative approach ensures that picture quality remains uncompromised even during digital zoom, enhancing the overall photography experience.

In 2010 Sony replaced the legacy DSLR design with SLT cameras, where the "SLT" stands for "single-lens translucent" which refers to a fixed beam splitter in the image path. Sony SLT can shoot movie files at Full HD 1080p AVCHD with continuous phase detection autofocus.

Along with the α33 and α55 cameras, Sony also announced one of the last Sony DSLRs - the α560 which can also shoot movie files at full HD stereo 1080p AVCHD, but with limited manual controls and no continuous AF. These three cameras use the same technology Sony Exmor APS HD CMOS sensor. The α33 and α55 are SLT based (fixed translucent mirrors) and can take movie files with continuous Auto Focus, whereas DSLRs using reflex mirrors typically cannot, at least not without limitations.

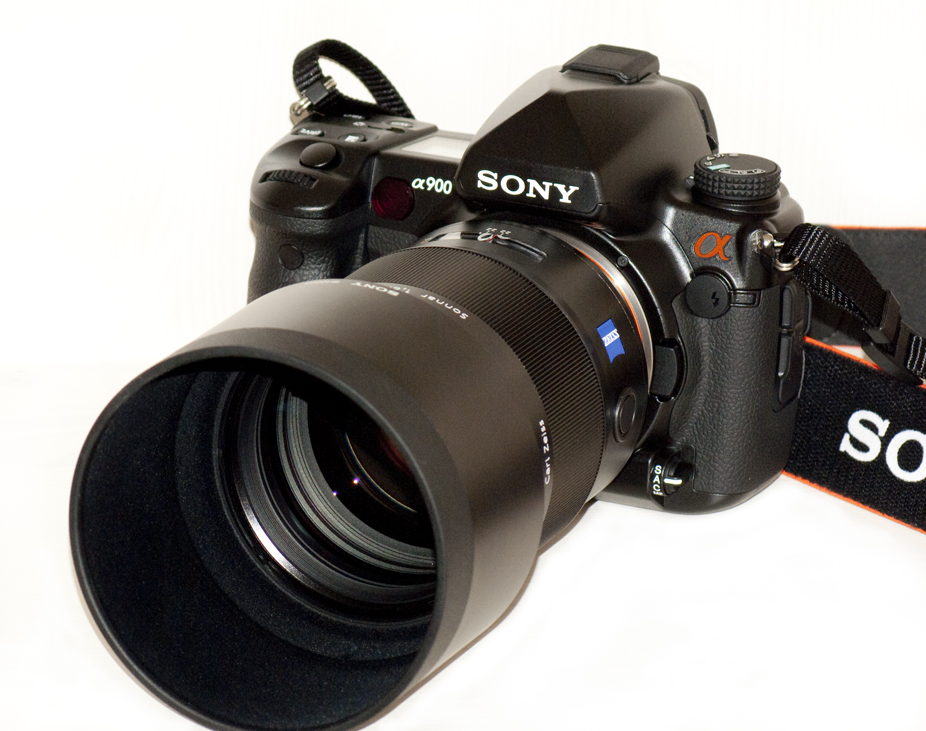
Sony α900 with Sony SAL-135F18Z

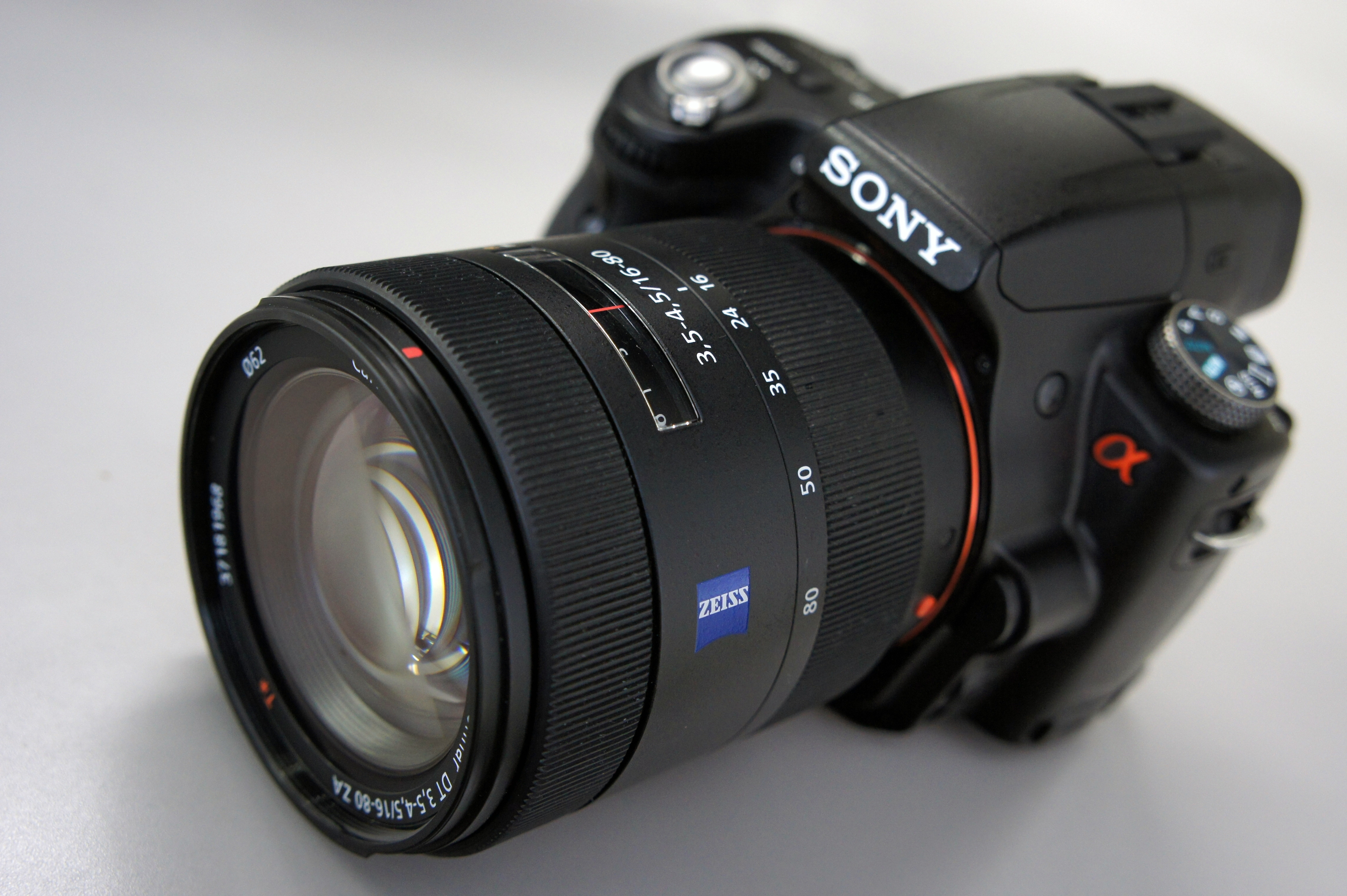
Sony α55 with SAL-1680Z

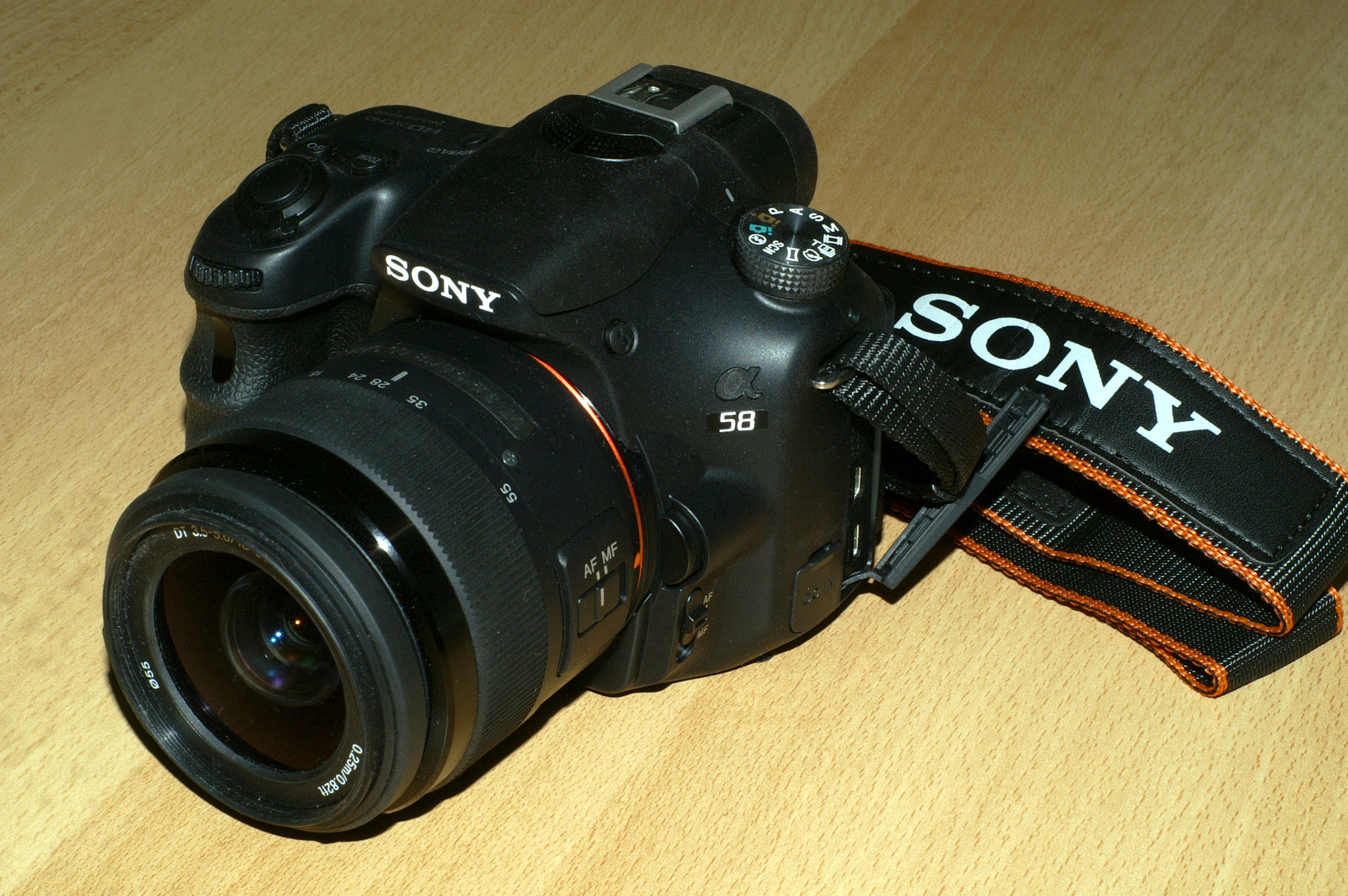
Sony α58 with SAL-1855-2

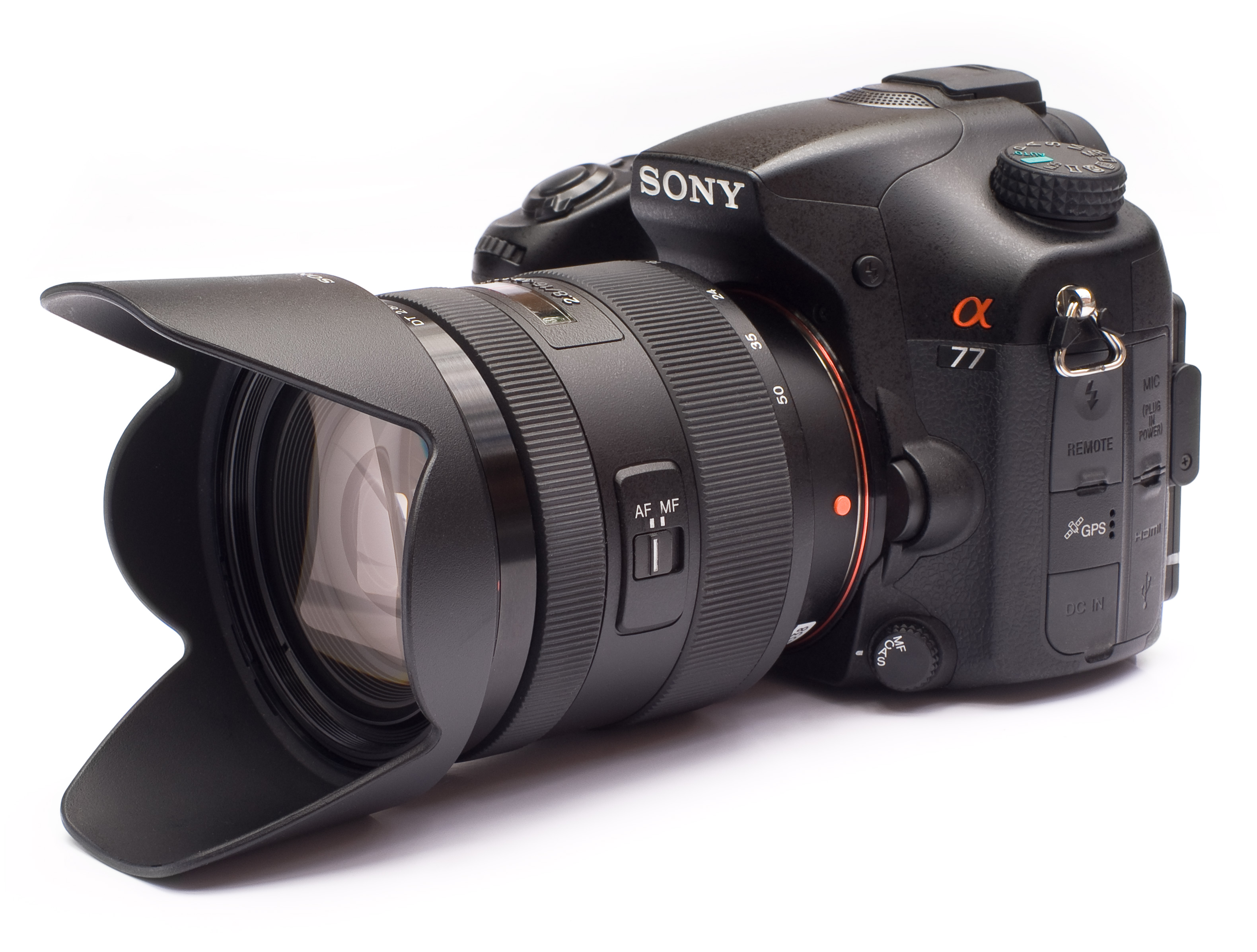
Sony α77, former flagship APS-C camera

== A-mount lenses ==
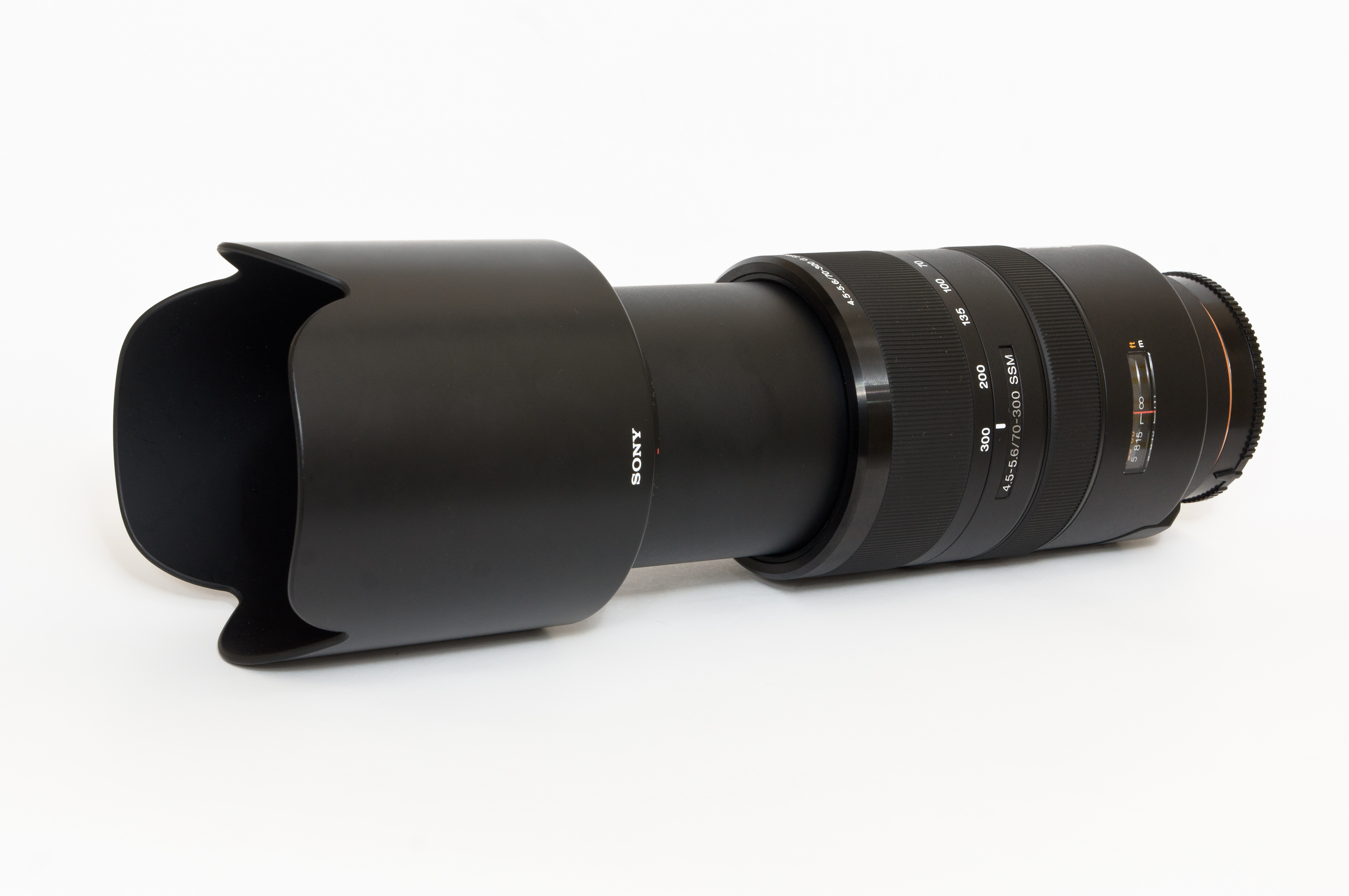
Sony 70-300mm f/4.5-5.6 G SSM (SAL-70300G) telephoto zoom lens

The A-mount, originally known as the A-type bayonet mount, was introduced by Minolta in 1985 as the world's first fully integrated SLR autofocus system. As a result, all Minolta A-mount lenses can be used on Sony DSLRs (except for that some newer camera features cannot be used), and all Sony A-mount lenses work on Minolta's film and digital SLRs (except for that SSM/SAM lenses can be used only with manual focusing on cameras not supporting SSM and that APS-C format lenses cannot reasonably be used on film cameras due to their smaller image circle). During the initial introduction of the α system in 2006, Sony announced 19 lenses and 2 tele-converters, of which the majority were rebranded Konica Minolta lenses. At the 2007 PMA trade show, Sony unveiled several new lenses, but referred to them only in qualitative terms and did not provide specifications.

On 18 May 2009, Sony introduced the first A-mount lenses to feature their new SAM (Smooth Auto-focus Motor) in-lens auto-focus motor for more lens-specific AF speed improvements. This introduction was made with the new "+30" series camera bodies (α350 + 30 = α380). These new bodies retain an in-body focus motor for backward compatibility with the historic lens collection. In addition, the new bodies utilize HDMI output for display on HDTV sets and feature dual memory card slots for both Sony's proprietary Memory Stick Pro Duo chips as well as SDHC media format, while eliminating CompactFlash support.

== E-mount lenses ==
In May 2010, Sony introduced two α NEX mirrorless interchangeable lens cameras equipped with the new proprietary Sony E-mount. A-mount lenses can be used in E-mount cameras with an adapter - five different adapters are available from Sony alone.

This includes mirrorless cameras as well as camcorders. First they were all called "NEX", but this name has been dropped for "ILCE" for the mirrorless stills cameras.

== Other accessories ==
=== Flash system ===
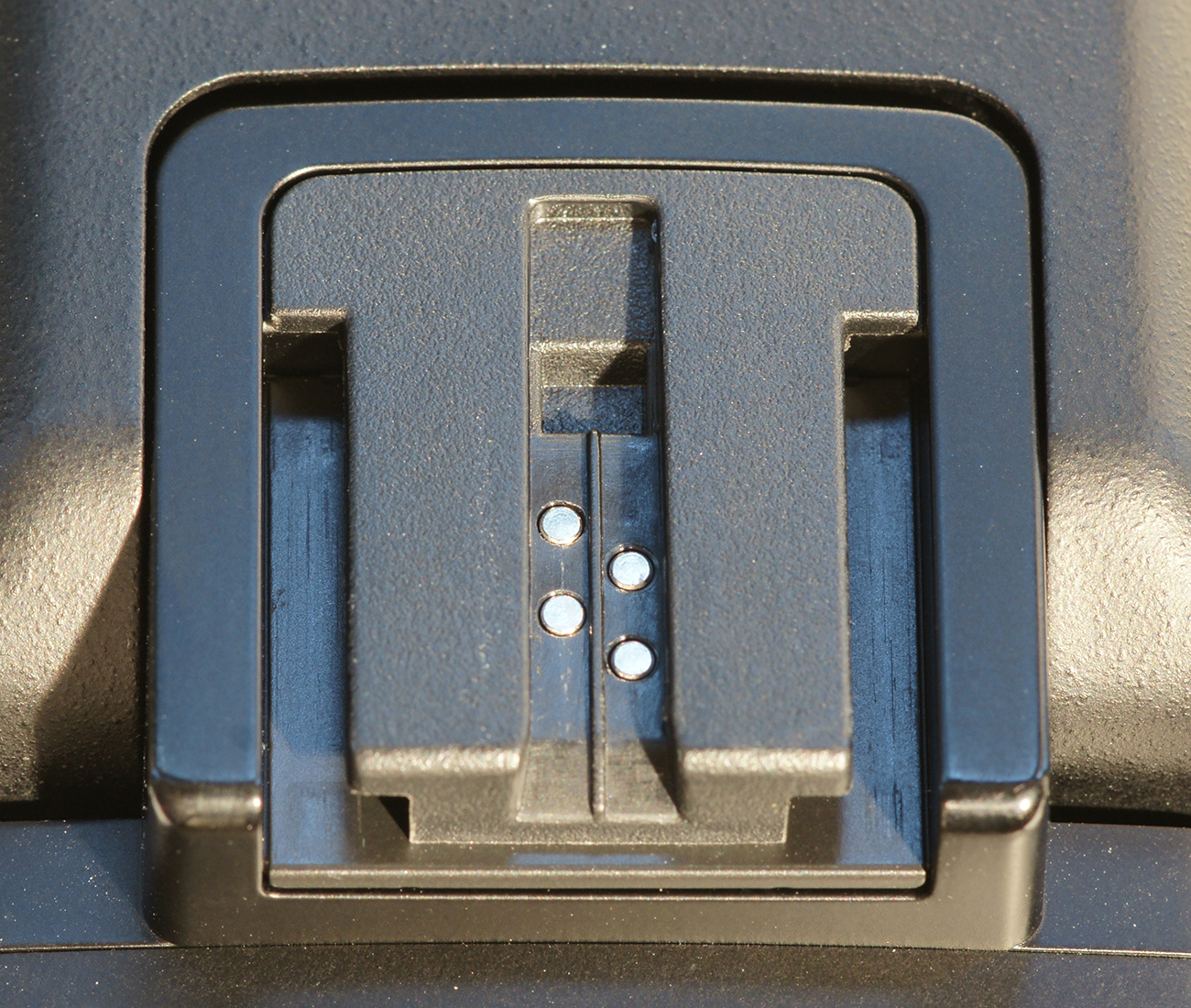
Auto-lock Accessory Shoe (a.k.a. iISO hotshoe) used between 1988 and 2012

The 4-pin iISO flash shoe (also known as the Auto-lock Accessory Shoe) on all Sony DSLRs/SLTs and some NEX models up to 2012-08 was introduced by Minolta in 1988 for their Maxxum/Dynax/α series of A-mount AF SLRs and was also used on their digital DiMAGE A cameras series. It offers a slide-on auto-locking mechanism but is mechanically incompatible with hotshoes based on the ISO 518 standard as utilized by most other camera and accessory manufacturers. A compatible 7-pin variant existed as well, but was rarely used by Minolta, and not at all by Sony. The passive adapters Minolta FS-1100 and FS-PC allow to adapt Minolta AF and TTL flashes with ISO-based foot to cameras with Auto-lock Accessory Shoe, whereas the FS-1200 allows users to use AF TTL flashes with Auto-lock Accessory Foot on earlier Minolta SLRs. These adapters provide no voltage protection or galvanic isolation, but they maintain TTL support with Minolta film cameras. Digital cameras, however, require digital-ready flashes for TTL support. If no TTL support, but voltage protection and galvanic isolation is required, the Sony FA-HS1AM can be used instead to mount ISO-based equipment on Auto-lock Accessory Shoe cameras. If no electrical connection is required, the mechanical adapter Sony FA-SA1AM can be used as well.

In 2012-09 Sony introduced a new 21+3-pin ISO-518 compatible hotshoe called Multi Interface Shoe, replacing the Auto-lock Accessory Shoe, previously used with α equipment. The adapter ADP-MAA adapts existing 4-pin auto-lock foot flashes to cameras with the new Multi Interface Shoe, whereas the adapter ADP-AMA allows photographers to use some new equipment with Multi Interface shoe on older cameras with Auto-lock Accessory Shoe.

The first two flash models released by Sony (HVL-F36AM and HVL-F56AM) are, like the first generation of lenses, rebadged models of the Minolta Program Flash 3600HS(D) and the Minolta Program Flash 5600HS(D). Later on Sony expanded its flash system further, allowing advanced wireless flash control, including grouping of external flashes into groups with full ratio control.

The HVL-RLAM and HVL-RL1 are ring-shaped LED continuous lights for use with video. To a limited extent they can also be used for macro photos of static objects, although a true macro flash is much preferred. The Sony flash system does not include a ring flash, but the Minolta R-1200 and 1200 AF ring flash heads can be used with the Minolta Macro Flash Controller MFC-1000 on Sony DSLRs as well, whereas the older Minolta Control Unit 1200 AF is not compatible with digital cameras. The MFC-1000 also accepts the Minolta Twin Flash T-2400 as well as the flash head of the Sony HVL-MT24AM twin flash, but not vice versa.

=== Vertical control grips ===
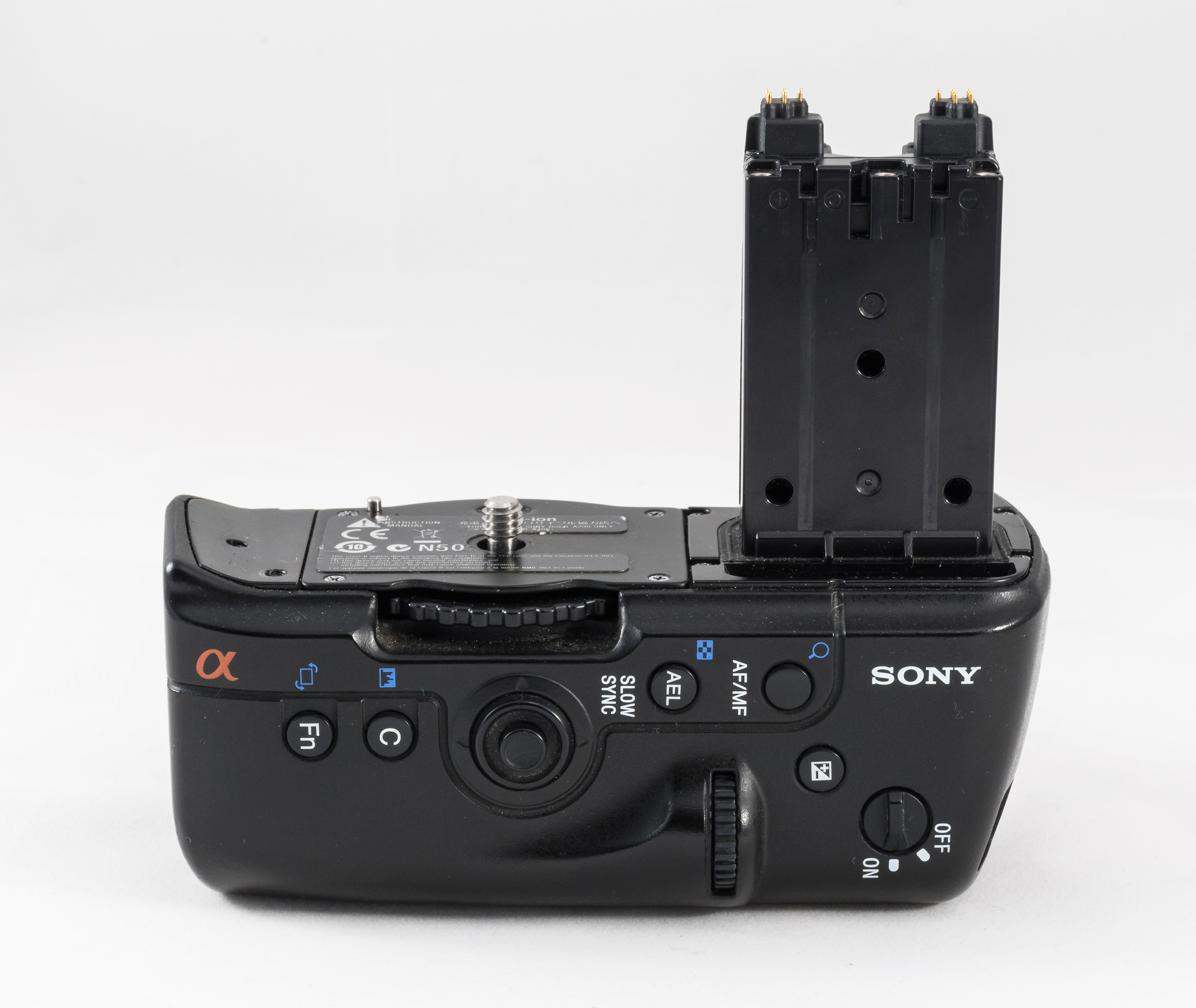
Grip VG-C70AM for Sony α700

Vertical control grips were released for a number of α DSLRs and MILCs, with the exception of most recent entry-level DSLRs: α230, α330, α380, α290 and α390. The new α65 will also get no vertical grip. All the vertical grips are sold separately.

Model	Compatible bodies	Supported number of batteries	Shutter release button	Grip sensor	Nearly fully duplicated controls, dials and stick	Mounting requires removal of camera battery	Compact design (no "smoke stack")	Number of strap eyelets for hand strap	Weather sealed
VG-B30AM	α200, α300, α350	1-2× NP-FM500H	Yes	No	No	Yes	No	1	No
VG-B50AM	α450, α500, α550, α560, α580	1-2× NP-FM500H	Yes	No	No	Yes	No	2	No
VG-C70AM	α700	1-2× NP-FM500H	Yes	Only in US model variant	Yes	Yes	No	1	Door
VG-C77AM	α77, α77 II, α99 II	1-2× NP-FM500H	Yes	No	Yes	Yes	No	2	Yes
VG-C90AM	α850, α900	1-2× NP-FM500H	Yes	No	Yes	Yes	No	2	Door
VG-C99AM	α99	1-2× NP-FM500H (plus 1× in camera)	Yes	No	Yes	No	Yes	2	Yes
VG-C1EM	α7, α7R, α7S	1-2× NP-FW50	Yes	No	No	Yes	No		Yes
VG-C2EM	α7 II, α7R II, α7S II	1-2× NP-FW50	Yes	No	No	Yes	No		Yes
VG-C3EM	α7 III, α7R III, α9	1-2× NP-FZ100	Yes	No	Yes	Yes	No		Yes
VG-C4EM	α7S III, α7R IV, α9-II, α7R V	1-2× NP-FZ100	Yes	No	Yes	Yes	No		Yes
VG-C5	α9-III	1-2× NP-FZ100	Yes	No	Yes	Yes	No		Yes

=== Other ===
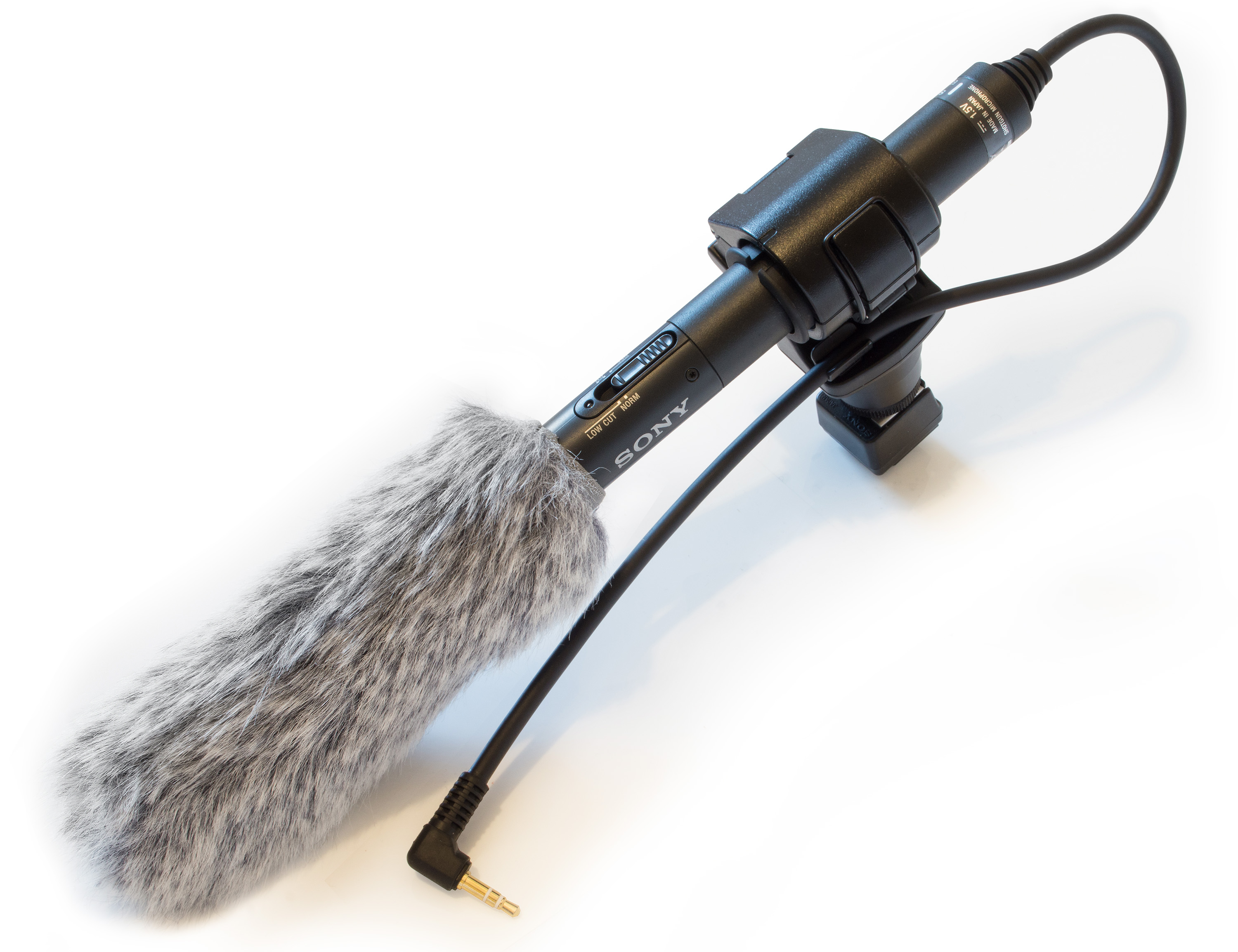
Sony ECM-CG50 shotgun microphone dedicated for video-capable α cameras

Designation	Description
ECM-ALST1	External stereo microphone
ECM-CG50	External shotgun microphone
CLM-V55	External LCD screen
HVL-LE1	LED video light
VCT-55LH	Cold shoe mounting bracket
XLR-K1M	XLR adapter with ECM-XM1 microphone

Level	Sensor	2004	2005	2006	2007	2008	2009	2010	2011		2012	2013	2014	2015	2016	2017	2018	2019	2020
Professional	Full frame						α900					α99				α99 II			
Professional	Full frame							α850											
High-end	APS-C		DG-7D			α700				α77				α77 II					
Midrange	APS-C									α65					α68				
Upper-entry	APS-C								α55		α57								
Upper-entry	APS-C				α100			α550 ^{F}	α580				α58						
Upper-entry	APS-C		DG-5D					α500	α560										
Upper-entry	APS-C							α450											
Entry-level	APS-C								α33	α35	α37								
Entry-level	APS-C					α350 ^{F}		α380	α390										
Entry-level	APS-C					α300		α330											
Entry-level	APS-C					α200		α230	α290										
Early models	Minolta 7000 with SB-70/SB-70S (1986) · Minolta 9000 with SB-90/SB-90S (1986) (Still video SLRs); Minolta MS-C1100 (1992) · Minolta RD-175 (1995)																		
Level	Sensor																		
Level	Sensor	2004	2005	2006	2007	2008	2009	2010	2011		2012	2013	2014	2015	2016	2017	2018	2019	2020

Family	Level	Format	'10	2011		2012	2013	2014	2015	2016	2017	2018	2019	2020	2021	2022	2023	2024	2025	2026
Alpha (α)	Indust	FF																ILX-LR1 ^{●}		
Alpha (α)	Cine line	FF													_{m} FX6 ^{●}					
Alpha (α)	Cine line	FF													_{m} FX3 ^{AT●}					
Alpha (α)	Cine line	FF																		_{m} FX2 ^{AT●}
Alpha (α)	Flag	FF													_{m} α1 ^{FT●}				_{m} α1 II ^{FAT●}	
Alpha (α)	Speed	FF										_{m} α9 ^{FT●}			_{m} α9 II ^{FT●}				_{m} α9 III ^{FAT●}	
Alpha (α)	Sens	FF							_{m} α7S ^{●}	_{m} α7S II ^{F●}					_{m} α7S III ^{AT●}					
Alpha (α)	Hi-Res	FF						_{m} α7R ^{●}		_{m} α7R II ^{F●}		_{m} α7R III ^{FT●}		_{m} α7R IV ^{FT●}			_{m} α7R V ^{FAT●}			_{m} α7R VI ^{FAT●}
Alpha (α)	Basic	FF						_{m} α7 ^{F●}	_{m} α7 II ^{F●}				_{m} α7 III ^{FT●}			_{m} α7 IV ^{AT●}				_{m} α7 V ^{FAT●}
Alpha (α)	Compact	FF																_{m} α7CR ^{AT●}		
Alpha (α)	Compact	FF													_{m} α7C ^{AT●}			_{m} α7C II ^{AT●}		
Alpha (α)	Vlog	FF																_{m} ZV-E1 ^{AT●}		
Alpha (α)	Cine	APS-C															_{m} FX30 ^{AT●}			
Alpha (α)	Adv	APS-C			_{s} NEX-7 ^{F●}						_{m} α6500 ^{FT●}			_{m} α6600 ^{FT●}				_{m} α6700 ^{AT●}		
Alpha (α)	Mid-range	APS-C				_{m} NEX-6 ^{F●}					_{m} α6300 ^{F●}		_{m} α6400 ^{F+T●}							
Alpha (α)	Mid-range	APS-C						_{m} α6000 ^{F●}						_{m} α6100 ^{FT●}						
Alpha (α)	Vlog	APS-C														_{m} ZV-E10 ^{AT●}			_{m} ZV-E10 II ^{AT●}	
Alpha (α)	Entry-level	APS-C	NEX-5 ^{F●}	NEX-5N ^{FT●}		NEX-5R ^{F+T●}	NEX-5T ^{F+T●}		α5100 ^{F+T●}											
Alpha (α)	Entry-level	APS-C	NEX-3 ^{F●}	NEX-C3 ^{F●}		NEX-F3 ^{F+●}	NEX-3N ^{F+●}	α5000 ^{F+●}												
DSLR-style		APS-C					_{m} α3000 ^{●}		_{m} α3500 ^{●}											
SmartShot		APS-C							QX1 ^{M●}											
CineAlta	Cine line	FF										VENICE				VENICE 2				
CineAlta	Cine line	FF																BURANO		
XDCAM	Cine line	FF												_{m} FX9						
XDCAM	Docu	S35							_{m} FS7		_{m} FS7 II									
XDCAM	Mobile	S35								_{m} FS5			_{m} FS5 II							
NXCAM	Pro	S35		NEX-FS100		NEX-FS700	NEX-FS700R													
NXCAM	APS-C					NEX-EA50														
Handycam	FF					_{m} NEX-VG900														
Handycam	APS-C		_{s} NEX-VG10		_{s} NEX-VG20	_{m} NEX-VG30														
Security		FF									SNC-VB770									
Security		FF									UMC-S3C									
Family	Level	Format																		
Family	Level	Format	'10	2011		2012	2013	2014	2015	2016	2017	2018	2019	2020	2021	2022	2023	2024	2025	2026
