= Minolta Varisoft Rokkor 85mm f/2.8 =

Still-photography camera lens

- Maker: Minolta

Technical data
- Focal length: 85mm
- Aperture (max/min): f/2.8-f/16
- Close focus distance: 0.8 m (2 ft 7 in)
- Construction: 6 elements in 5 groups

Features
- Ultrasonic motor: No No
- Macro capable: No No
- Unique features: Soft focus by varying spherical aberration

Physical
- Max. length: 80 mm (3.1 in)
- Diameter: 70 mm (2.8 in)
- Weight: 430 g (15 oz)
- Filter diameter: 55mm

Angle of view
- Diagonal: 29°

History
- Successor: AF 100mm f/2.8 Soft Focus; STF 135mm f/2.8 [T4.5]

The Varisoft Rokkor 85mm f/2.8 is a prime portrait lens produced by Minolta for Minolta SR-mount single lens reflex cameras, introduced in 1978 as the system's first soft focus lens. In addition to the conventional focusing and aperture selection control rings, the lens has a third ring which varies the degree of spherical aberration by adjusting the air gap between the last two elements.

== Design and history ==
The design for the Varisoft Rokkor is covered in U.S. Patents 4,124,276A, by Yukio Okano, Akiyoshi Nakamura, and Toshinobu Ogura (1975) and 4,214,814A by Shuji Ogino, Ogura, Okano, and Nakamura (1977). As described in marketing literature, there is a four-position, click-stopped control ring to vary the amount of spherical aberration. When the ring is set to #0, aberration is minimized, while it is maximized at #3 and continuously variable in between click stops.

From the first patent (4,124,276A), the first four elements (marked A-I) are moved as a unit to focus the lens, increasing the meniscus-shaped air gap between the fourth element and the fifth element (marked A-II) as the lens is focused closer. Spherical aberration increases with the air gap distance between the fifth and sixth element (marked B). In the patent summary, the inventors noted the object side lens group was a Tessar design, although they added that any suitable lens would do, such as a Cooke triplet or Double Gauss lens; the preferred embodiment uses two mensicus lenses on the image side. In the second patent (4,214,814A), the same basic system was used, but the rear (image side) two elements were moved as a group to vary spherical aberration, and the entire lens was moved as a unit to focus. A lens diagram published by Minolta indicates the lens is based on the first patent, with the rearmost element moved to control aberration.

Variable softness lenses focused at infinity, with maximum (top) and minimum (bottom) settings for spherical aberration

Embodiment 3 of U.S. Patent 4,124,276A (Okano, Nakamura, and Ogura, 1975).

Embodiment 1 of U.S. Patent 4,214,814A (Ogino, Ogura, Okano, and Nakamura, 1977).

The actual amount of spherical aberration that will be realized is a combination of both the soft focus and aperture settings. Because of this, although the lens was introduced in 1978, after the Rokkor lens line was revised to add the MD tab to the aperture control ring, all versions of the Varisoft Rokkor are equipped only with a meter coupling tab (MC) on the aperture control ring and these lenses are limited to aperture priority autoexposure and manual exposure modes. There are two versions of this lens, with only minor cosmetic differences between the two; older lenses (prior to 1984) have "Rokkor" or "Rokkor-X" on the front ring, while later lenses do not.

The Varisoft had disappeared from Minolta's price lists by 1994. In 1995, Minolta introduced an AF 100mm f/2.8 Soft Focus lens for its A-mount cameras.

== See also ==
- List of Minolta SR-mount lenses
