= Minolta UW Rokkor 18mm f/9.5 =

Still-photography camera lens

Minolta UW Rokkor-PG 18mm f/9.5
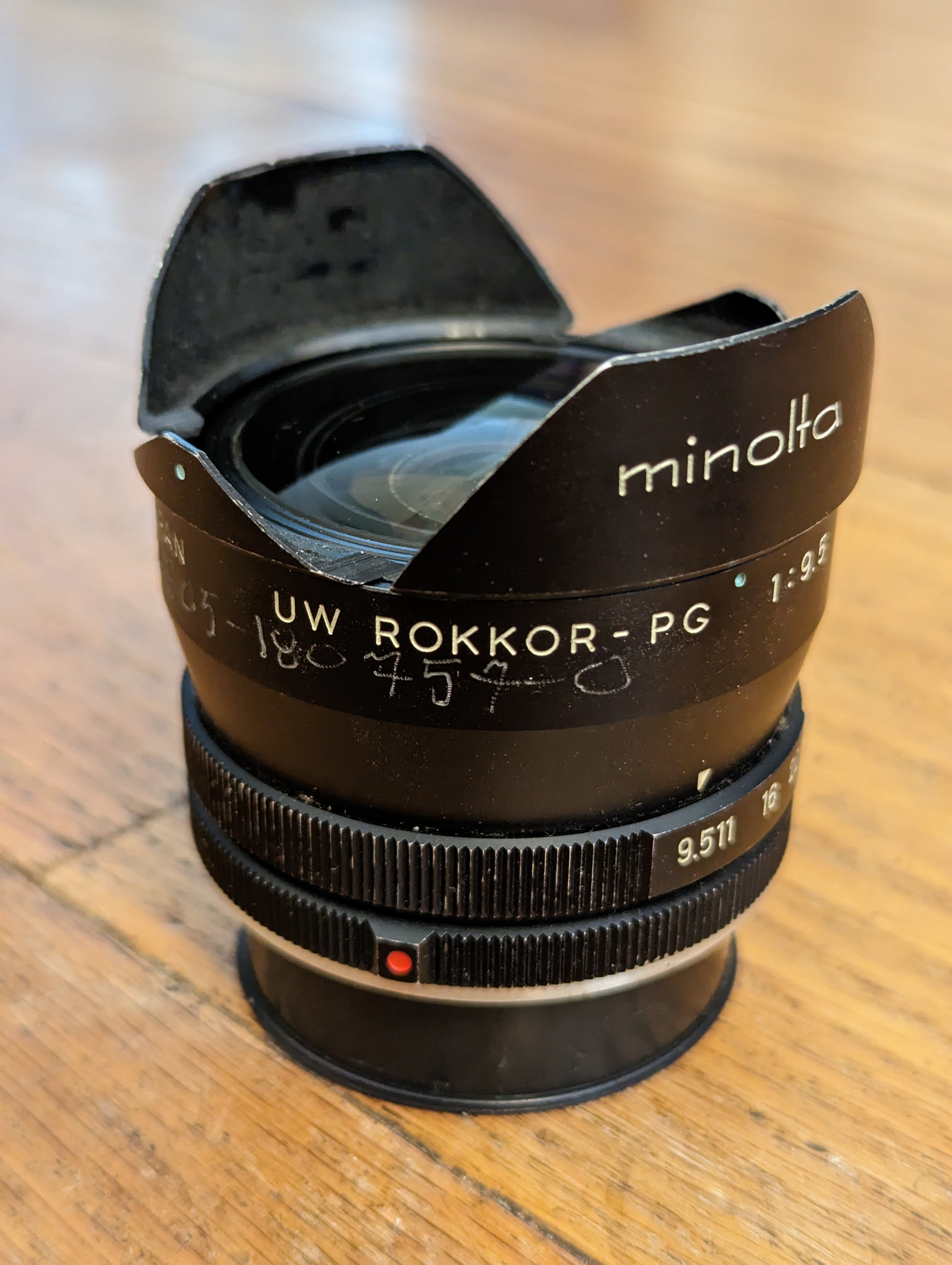
- With hood mounted
- Maker: Minolta

Technical data
- Focal length: 18mm
- Aperture (max/min): f/9.5-f/22
- Close focus distance: fixed
- Construction: 7 elements in 5 groups

Features
- Ultrasonic motor: No No
- Macro capable: No No
- Unique features: Fisheye

Physical
- Max. length: 41 mm (1.6 in)
- Diameter: 59 mm (2.3 in)
- Weight: 230 g (8.1 oz)
- Filter diameter: Rear

Accessories
- Lens hood: Bayonet Flower

Angle of view
- Diagonal: 180°

History
- Introduction: 1966
- Discontinuation: 1969
- Successor: Fish-Eye Rokkor 16mm f/2.8

The UW Rokkor 18mm f/9.5 is a prime fisheye lens produced by Minolta for Minolta SR-mount single lens reflex cameras, introduced in 1966 as the system's first fisheye lens. It is a full-frame fisheye lens with a 180° viewing angle across the diagonal, and was replaced when the Minolta Fish-Eye Rokkor 16mm f/2.8 lens was released in 1969.

== Design and history ==
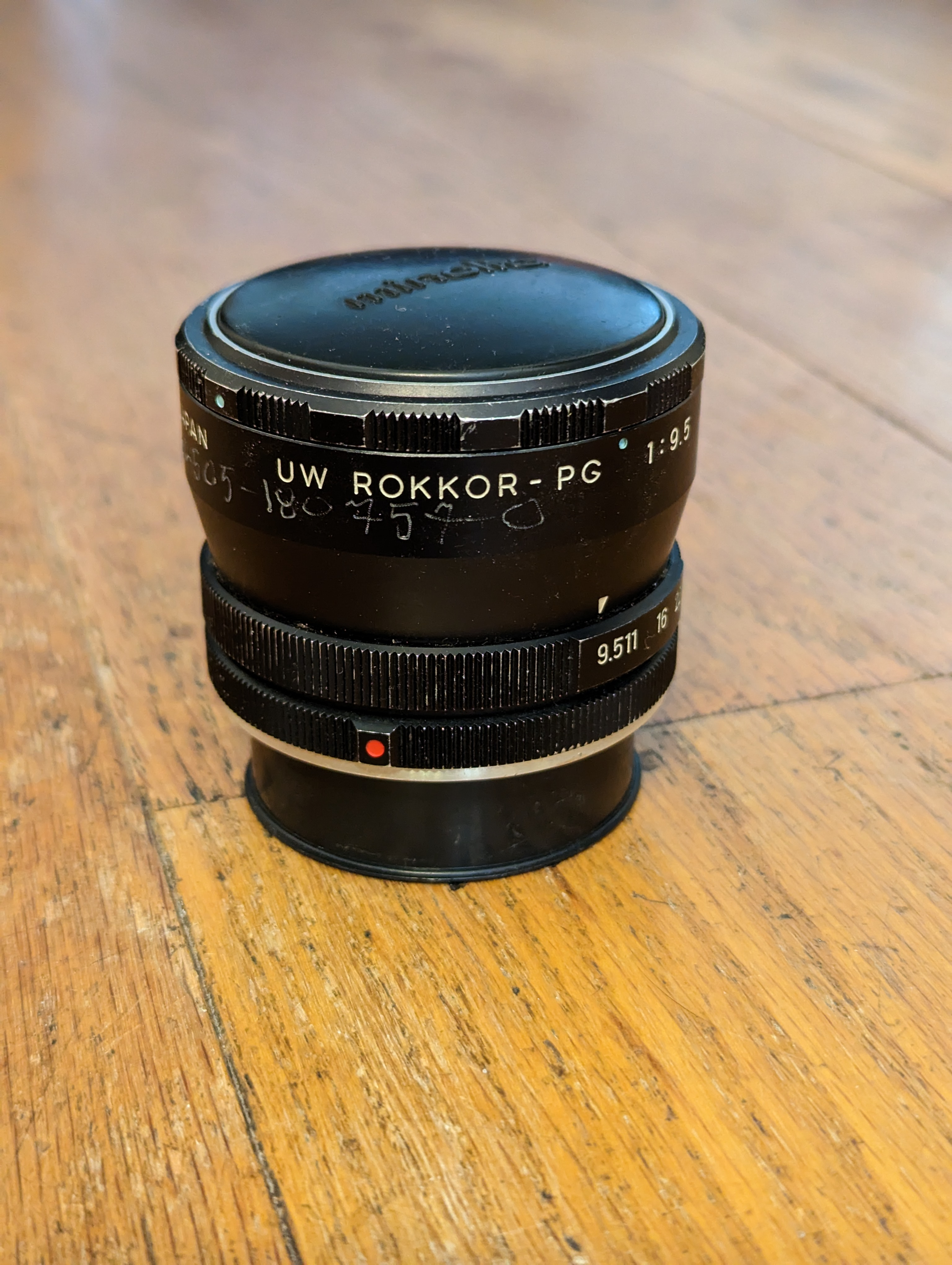
With lens caps

Unlike most contemporary fisheye lenses from other camera manufacturers, the UW Rokkor-PG did not require the reflex mirror to be locked up, so the SLR viewfinder could be used. It is a fixed-focus, manual diaphragm lens; the only control on the lens is the aperture, which may be set between f/9.5 and 22. The flower hood is mounted via the same internal quarter-turn bayonet used to secure the front lens cap.

In 1968, the suggested retail price was US$159.50 (equivalent to $1,442 in 2024), including case.

Due to the extreme angle of view, the front of the lens does not have a mount for filters; threaded filters attach to the rear of the lens. The lens was provided with UV and yellow (Y48) filters. Later, a red filter was available separately. Although corporate literature describes it as a 6-element, 4-group lens, the suffix (-PG) indicates it is a 7-element, 5-group lens, meaning the filter is considered part of the optical design.

== See also ==
- List of Minolta SR-mount lenses
