= Α mount system =

α mount system or Alpha mount system may refer to:

- Minolta A-mount system, an AF SLR system introduced by Minolta in 1985
- Konica Minolta A-mount system, an AF DSLR system by Konica Minolta between 2004 and 2006
- Sony α system, a camera system containing A-mount and E-mount digital cameras by Sony since 2006

== See also ==
- Sony A-mount system, a digital camera system by Sony since 2006
- Sony E-mount system, a digital camera system by Sony since 2010
