= Minolta Fish-Eye Rokkor 16mm f/2.8 =

Still-photography camera lens

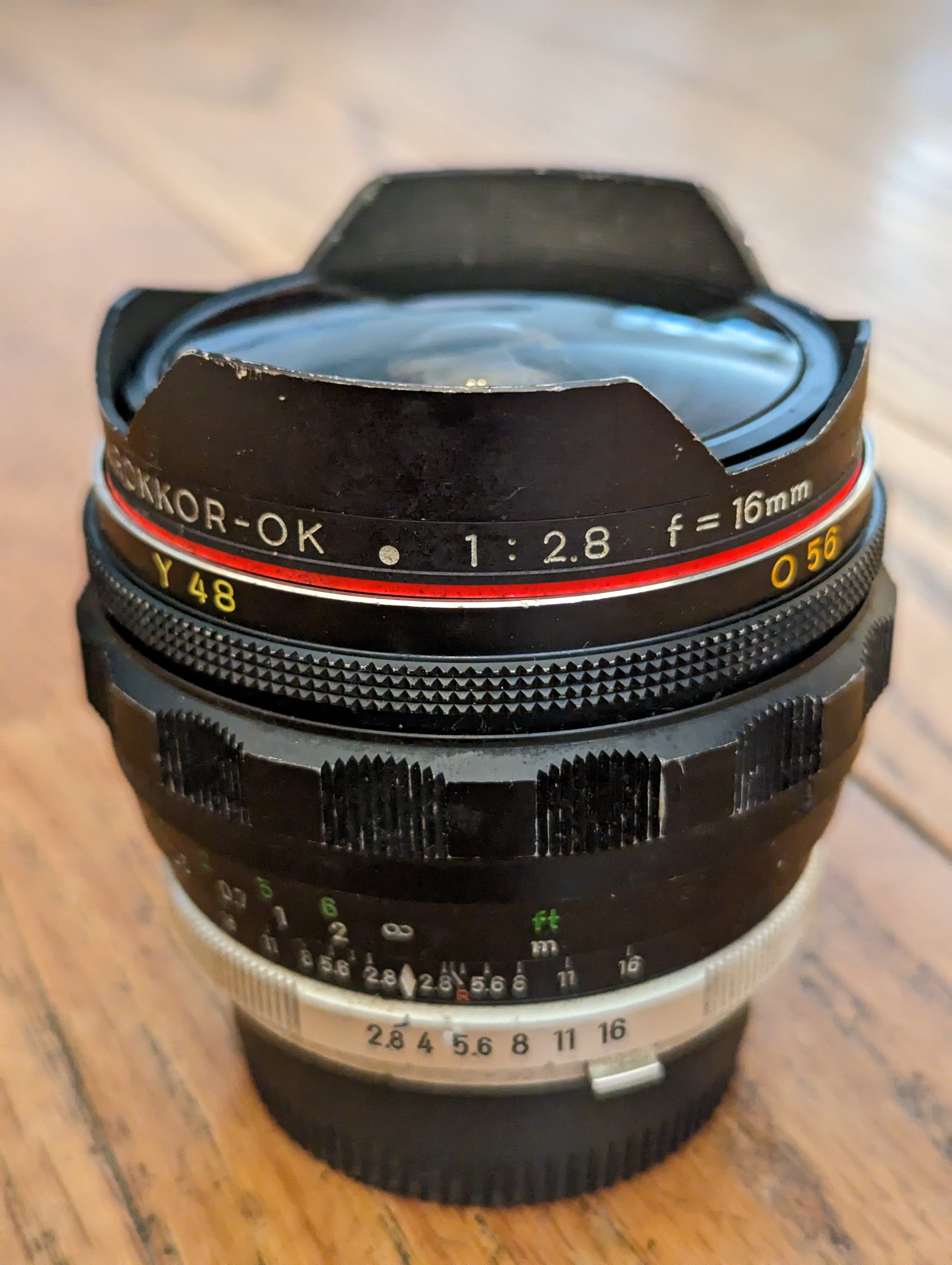
- Original (1969) version, MC Fish-Eye Rokkor-OK with scalloped metal focusing ring
- Maker: Minolta

Technical data
- Focal length: 16mm
- Aperture (max/min): f/2.8-f/16
- Close focus distance: 0.25–0.3 m (0.82–0.98 ft)
- Construction: 11 elements in 8 groups

Features
- Ultrasonic motor: No No
- Macro capable: No No
- Unique features: Fisheye

Physical
- Max. length: 43–63.5 mm (1.7–2.5 in)
- Diameter: 64.5–73 mm (2.5–2.9 in)
- Weight: 256–445 g (9.0–15.7 oz)
- Filter diameter: Integrated

Accessories
- Lens hood: Integrated Flower

Angle of view
- Diagonal: 180°

History
- Introduction: 1969
- Predecessor: UW Rokkor 18mm f/9.5
- Successor: AF Fish-Eye 16mm f/2.8

The Fish-Eye Rokkor 16mm f/2.8 is a prime fisheye lens produced by Minolta for Minolta SR-mount single lens reflex cameras, introduced in 1969 to replace an earlier fisheye lens, the UW Rokkor 18mm f/9.5. It is a full-frame fisheye lens with a 180° viewing angle across the diagonal.

This lens was licensed by Leitz and released for Leica R mount cameras as the Leica Fisheye-Elmarit-R 16mm f/2.8; it also was released as an autofocus lens for Minolta A-mount system cameras.

== Design and history ==
Minolta updated the design several times during the course of production:

- 1969: MC Fish-Eye Rokkor-OK 16mm f/2.8
- 1973: MC Fish-Eye Rokkor(-X) OK 16mm f/2.8
- 1977: MD Fish-Eye Rokkor(-X) 16mm f/2.8
- 1978: MD Fish-Eye Rokkor(-X) 16mm f/2.8
- 1980: MD Fish-Eye Rokkor(-X) 16mm f/2.8
- 1981: MD Fish-Eye 16mm f/2.8

The original design, by Toshinobu Ogura, used 11 elements in 8 groups, as designated by the -OK suffix. Lenses sold in the United States starting in 1973 were given Rokkor-X branding. Most of the updates since the original release were cosmetic, aside from the 1980 update, which changed the design to 10 elements in 7 groups and reduced the size and weight, designed by Mitsuaki Horimoto.

The 11e/8g Ogura design was licensed by Leitz and assembled by Minolta for Leica R-mount cameras; the Fisheye-Elmarit-R was released in 1974 and continued in production until 2001. When the Minolta A-mount system was released in 1985, the 11e/8g Ogura design was revived as an autofocus lens, the Minolta AF Fish-Eye 16mm f/2.8 (1986). Production of this lens continued after the A-mount system was purchased by Sony.

Due to the extreme angle of view, the front of the lens does not have a mount for filters; four filters for black-and-white and color photography are built in and selected by a rotating dial near the front on the body of the lens. Filter selection varies by the lens design. The 1969 version includes normal/UV (1A), orange (O56), yellow (Y48), and cooling (80B) filters.

Minolta 16mm fisheye lenses for SR-mount
Model Spec		MC Fish-Eye Rokkor-OK 16mm f/2.8	MC Fish-Eye Rokkor(-X) OK 16mm f/2.8	MD Fish-Eye Rokkor(-X) 16mm f/2.8	MD Fish-Eye Rokkor(-X) 16mm f/2.8	MD Fish-Eye Rokkor(-X) 16mm f/2.8	MD Fish-Eye 16mm f/2.8
Year		1969	1973	1977	1978	1980	1981
Construction	Diagram						
Construction	Elements	11				10	
Construction	Groups	8				7	
Aperture		f/2.8–16		f/2.8–22			
Min. focus		0.3 m (11.8 in)				0.25 m (9.8 in)	
Metering features	Meter coupling (MC) tab	Yes	Yes	Yes	Yes	Yes	Yes
Metering features	Minimum diaphragm (MD) tab	No	No	Yes	Yes	Yes	Yes
Metering features	Aperture lock	No	No	No	No	No	Yes
Dimensions	Diam.	73 mm (2.9 in)	70.6 mm (2.8 in)			64.5 mm (2.5 in)	
Dimensions	Length	63.5 mm (2.5 in)				43 mm (1.7 in)	
Dimensions	Weight	445 g (15.7 oz)	440 g (16 oz)			265 g (9.3 oz)	
Filters	1A (Normal)	Yes	Yes	Yes	Yes	Yes	Yes
Filters	R60 (Red)	No	No	No	No	Yes	Yes
Filters	O56 (Orange)	Yes	Yes	Yes	Yes	No	No
Filters	Y48 (Yellow)	Yes	Yes	No	No	No	No
Filters	Y52 (Yellow)	No	No	Yes	Yes	Yes	Yes
Filters	B12 (Blue)	No	No	No	No	Yes	Yes
Filters	80B (Cooling)	Yes	Yes	Yes	Yes	No	No

== See also ==
- List of Minolta SR-mount lenses
