= List of Minolta SR-mount lenses =

Minolta sold cameras and lenses with the Minolta SR-mount between 1958 and 1996.

== Nomenclature ==
Rokkor suffix coding (pre-1975)
Elements Groups (Note: As noted, a mixture of Latin numerals and Greek numerical prefixes to ensure a unique letter for each value.)			3	4	5	6	7	8	9	10	11	12
Elements Groups			C	D	E	F	G	H	I	J	K	L
3	(trēs)	T	-TC (100, 135)	-TD (45, 300)	not used							
4	(quattuor)	Q	—N/a	-QD (135, 300)	-QE (35, 100, 200)	-QF (50, 200, 250)	not used	-QH (21)	not used			
5	(penta)	P	—N/a		-PE (200)	-PF (50, 53, 55, 58, 85, 100, 135)	-PG (18, 50, 58, 135)	not used	-PI (21)	not used		
6	(hexa)	H	—N/a			-HF (300)	-HG (35)	-HH (35)	not used			
7	(septem)	S	—N/a				-SG (28)	not used	-SI (28)	not used		
8	(octō)	O	—N/a					not used			-OK (16)	not used
9	(novem)	N	—N/a						not used			-NL (21)

Most Minolta lenses for SR-mount cameras are branded Rokkor; in the United States, to combat unofficial gray market imports, lenses officially imported were engraved as Rokkor-X, with the X colored orange. Before 1975, lenses also carried a two-letter suffix indicating the construction.

Because the number of groups is always equal to or less than the number of lens elements, certain combinations are not possible (for instance -QC, which would be a four-group, three-element lens). In other cases, the combination is not used, such as -QG, which would be a four-group, seven-element lens. Although the -OJ suffix was never used for a production lens, a prototype MC Rokkor-OJ 24 mm f/2.8 lens was shown at Photokina 1970.

In addition to Rokkor-branded lenses, Minolta also sold a lower-cost line of lenses, designated Celtic. Compared to the Rokkor lenses, Celtic lenses have less sophisticated coatings.

In the final series of lenses (after 1981), the "Rokkor" branding was dropped.

=== Generations ===
MC and MD tabs on Minolta XD-5

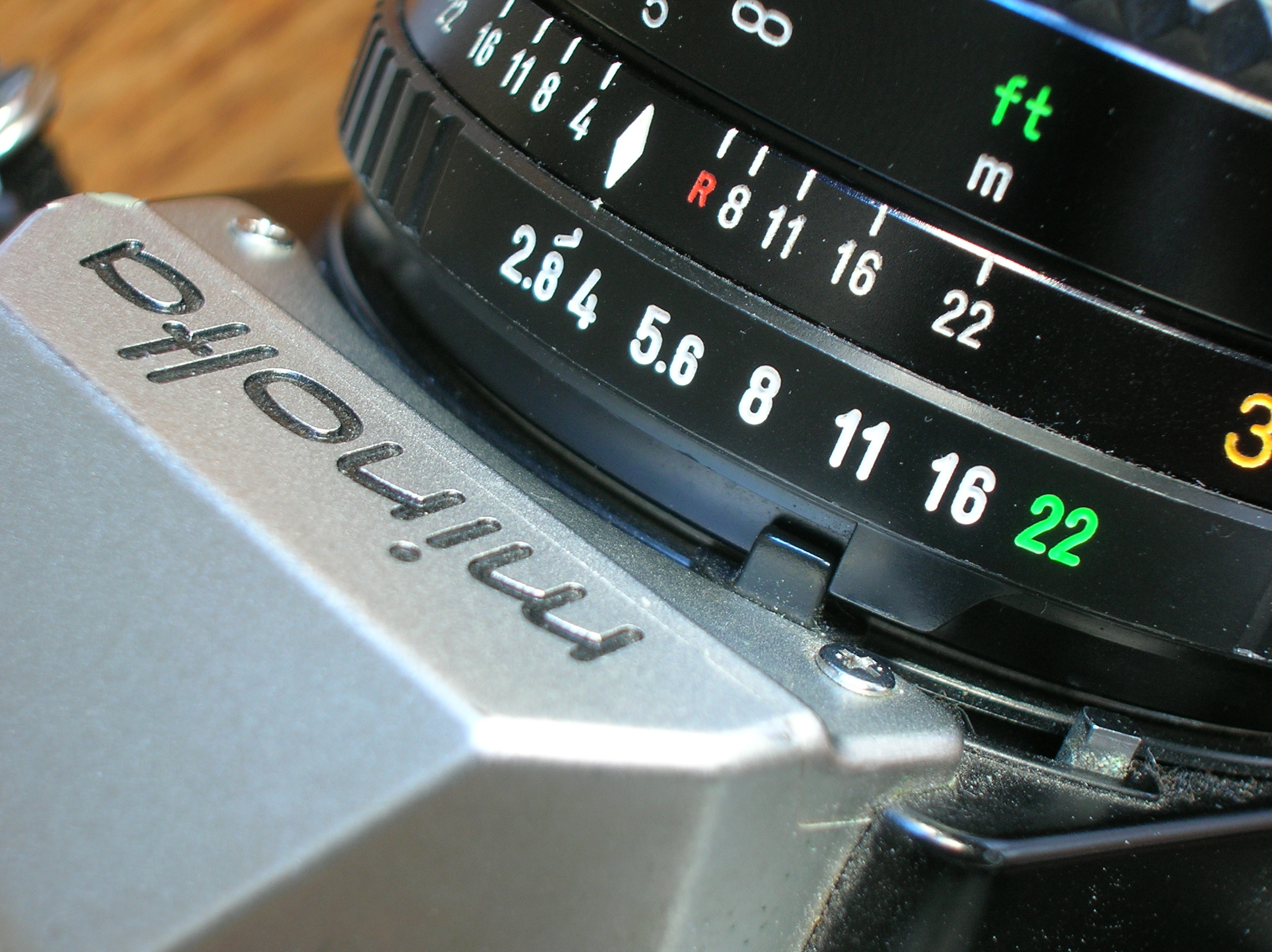
MC tab, just under the engraved f/16 on the aperture ring of the lens, engages with a corresponding tab (colored black) on the camera body.

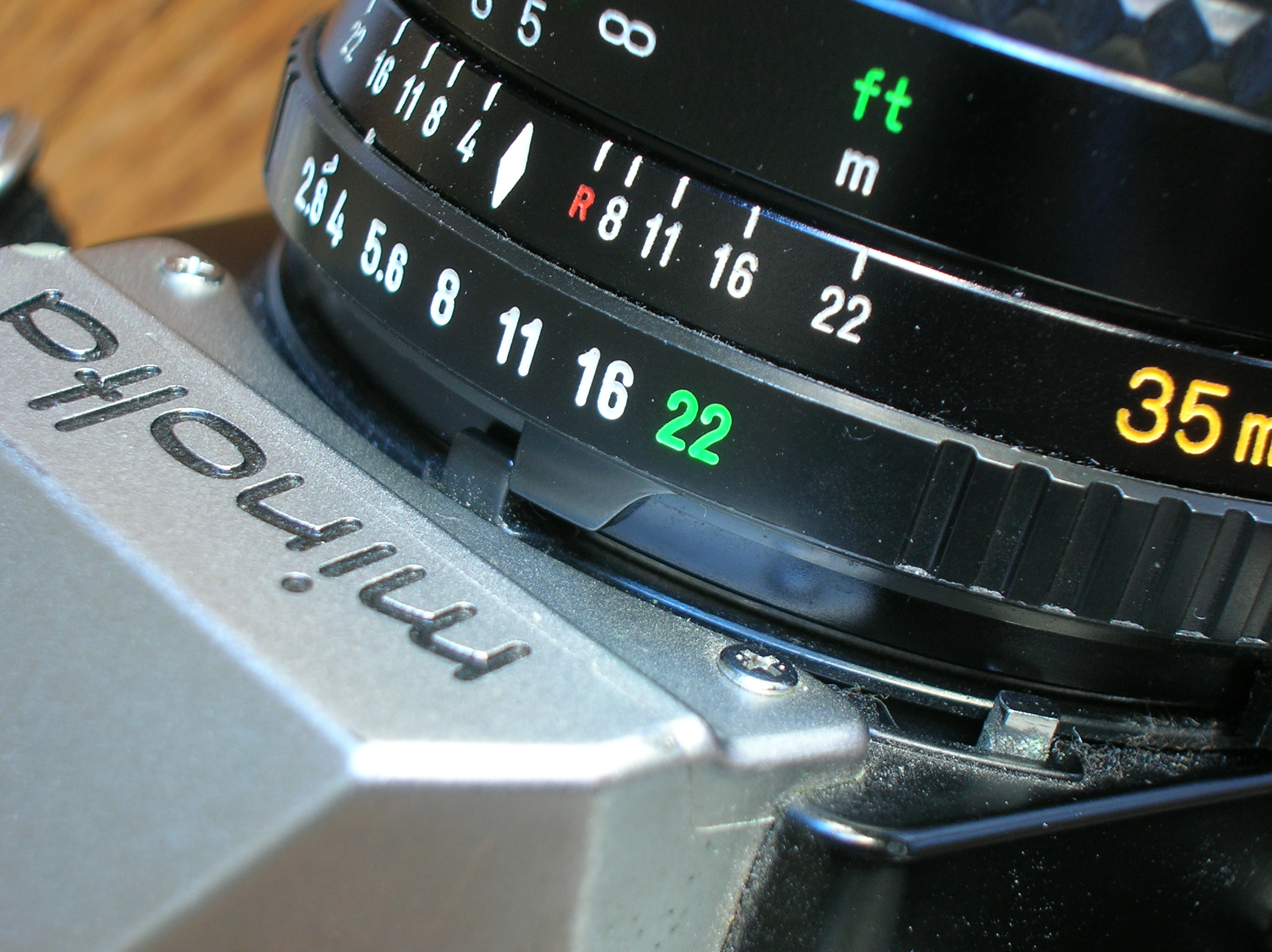
As the lens is stopped down, the in-camera meter is able to determine the aperture that was set (in this case, f/8) by the displacement of the black metering tab.

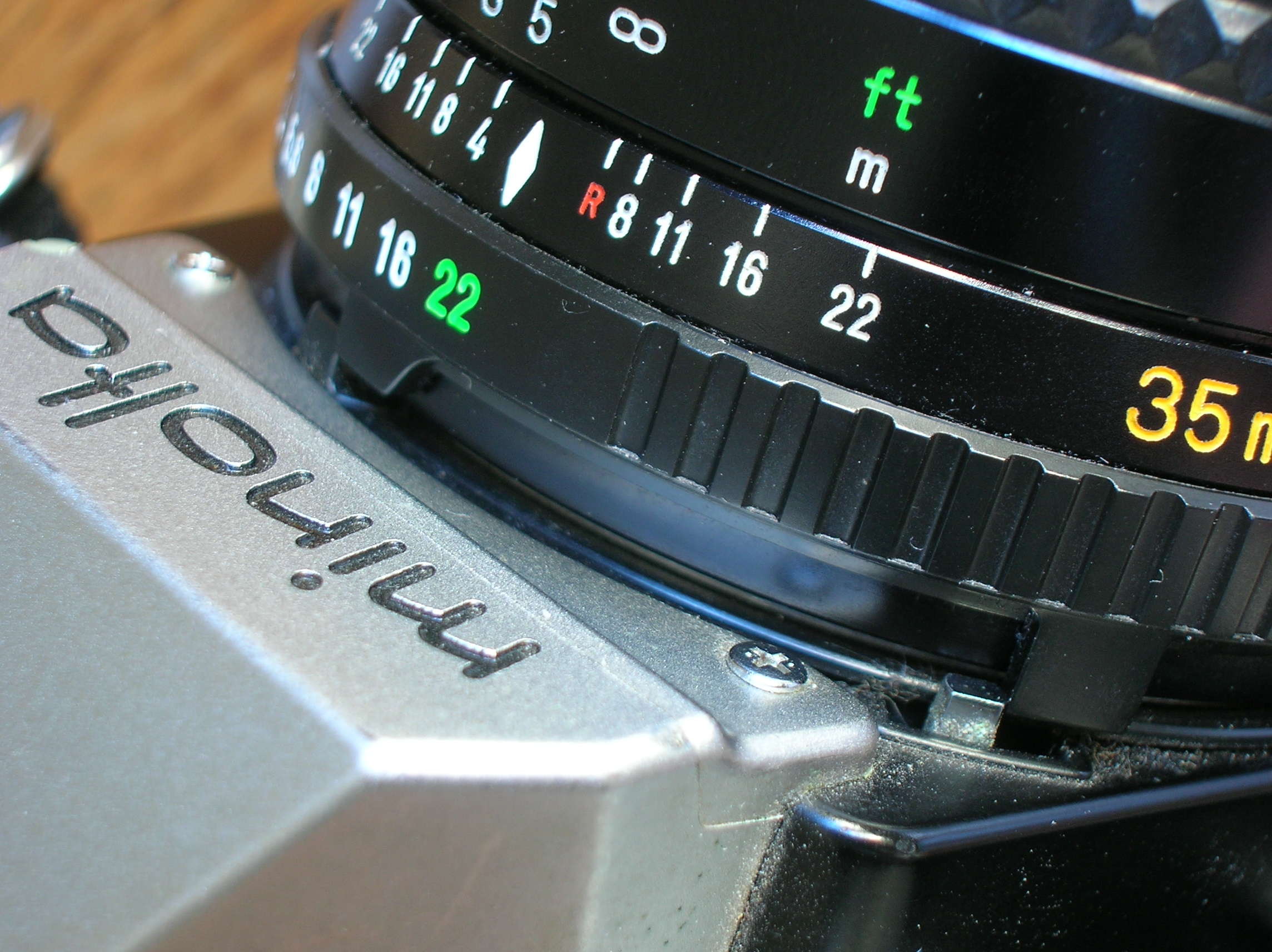
The MD tab displaces a separate tab on the camera body (colored silver, in the bottom right corner of this photograph) when the lens is set to its minimum diaphragm (f/22) for shutter-priority autoexposure.

Minolta SR-mount lenses can be broken into three broad generations with some overlap:

1. Pre-MC (1958): Lenses with manual, preset, and automatic diaphragms, without the meter coupling (MC) tab on the aperture ring to signal the f-stop that was selected to the in-body light meter.
2. MC (1966): Lenses with automatic diaphragms, with the MC tab.
3. MD (1977): Lenses with automatic diaphragms and the MC tab, and an additional minimum diaphragm (MD) tab to signal the minimum aperture opening size (largest f-stop value) of the lens to the body for shutter-priority autoexposure.

In general, MD lenses tend to incorporate more plastic components and are lighter than MC and pre-MC lenses. Within each of these generations, there are minor differences which are generally cosmetic changes.

Minolta SR lens generations
Name	Generation	Years	Example	Notes
Pre-MC	SR	1958 – 1966	SR: UW.Rokkor-PG 18mm f/9.5, fisheye lens.	The earliest lenses had pre-set and manual aperture controls. Lens engraving included "Rokkor" branding, basic construction details, maximum aperture (1:nnn), and focal length (f=nn mm).
Pre-MC	AR (I)	1958 – 1960		These were contemporaneous with the SR lenses, and had automatic diaphragm, as designated by the engraved "Auto Rokkor" (AR) name.
Pre-MC	AR (II)	1961 – 1964	AR (II): Auto-Rokkor-PF 58mm f/1.4, note chrome nose (filter ring) and evenly spaced f-stop engraving	These are distinguished from the earlier AR (I) lenses by the evenly spaced f-stop engravings.
Pre-MC	"Compact"	1965 – 1967		Encompassing both AR and SR types; most have 52 mm front filter threads using a black-colored nose, while preceding generations had 55 mm with a chrome nose.
MC	MC (I)	1966 – 1969	MC (I): MC W.Rokkor-SI 28mm f/2.5; note flat knurled sections between smooth borders	These lenses have a meter coupling tab on the aperture ring to signal the aperture setting to the body. The aperture ring is colored silver, while prior generations were colored black.
MC	MC (II)	1967 – 1972	MC (II): MC Fish-Eye Rokkor-OK 16mm f/2.8; note deeply "scalloped" focusing ring grip	Cosmetically similar to MC (I) with a more deeply scalloped focusing grip knurling.
MC	MC-X	1972 – 1976	Example of MC-X generation lens: MC Rokkor-HH 35mm .mw-parser-output span.fnumber,.mw-parser-output .fnumber-fallback{display:inline-block;white-space:nowrap;width:max-content}.mw-parser-output span.fnumber::first-letter,.mw-parser-output .fnumber-fallback .first-letter{font-style:italic;font-family:Trebuchet MS,Candara,Georgia,Calibri,Corbel,serif}.mw-parser-output span.fnumber.noitalic::first-letter,.mw-parser-output .fnumber-fallback.noitalic .first-letter{font-style:normal;font-family:inherit}f/1.8; note rubberized focusing grip and MC tab (just under the engraved "11" aperture value)	Rubberized focusing grip with square, truncated pyramid shapes; aperture ring reverts to black. Starting in the mid-1970s, Minolta began adding two to three anti-reflection coating layers to balance color and contrast across the lens lineup.
MC	MC Celtic	1972 – 1976		Budget line. Cosmetically similar to MC-X, with a different rubber grip waffle pattern (finely-spaced rectangular) and simplified coatings. The first lens was a 135 mm f/3.5 branded MC Celtic-QD, with a metal focusing ring and silver aperture ring similar to MC (I), and the Minolta name did not appear on the lens.
MD	MD (I)	1977	MD (I): 28–70mm .mw-parser-output span.fnumber,.mw-parser-output .fnumber-fallback{display:inline-block;white-space:nowrap;width:max-content}.mw-parser-output span.fnumber::first-letter,.mw-parser-output .fnumber-fallback .first-letter{font-style:italic;font-family:Trebuchet MS,Candara,Georgia,Calibri,Corbel,serif}.mw-parser-output span.fnumber.noitalic::first-letter,.mw-parser-output .fnumber-fallback.noitalic .first-letter{font-style:normal;font-family:inherit}f/3.5~4.8 zoom lens	Additional tab added to signal the minimum aperture value (largest f-stop number, smallest diaphragm opening) has been set; aperture ring becomes plastic.
MD	MD (II)	1978 – 1980	MD (II): 50mm .mw-parser-output span.fnumber,.mw-parser-output .fnumber-fallback{display:inline-block;white-space:nowrap;width:max-content}.mw-parser-output span.fnumber::first-letter,.mw-parser-output .fnumber-fallback .first-letter{font-style:italic;font-family:Trebuchet MS,Candara,Georgia,Calibri,Corbel,serif}.mw-parser-output span.fnumber.noitalic::first-letter,.mw-parser-output .fnumber-fallback.noitalic .first-letter{font-style:normal;font-family:inherit}f/1.4, note focal length immediately follows "MD"	Cosmetic update to put focal length before maximum aperture on the front nameplate.
MD	MD Celtic	1977 – 1980		Update of MC Celtic, adding MD tab.
MD	MD (III)	1981 – 1984	MD (II): 50mm .mw-parser-output span.fnumber,.mw-parser-output .fnumber-fallback{display:inline-block;white-space:nowrap;width:max-content}.mw-parser-output span.fnumber::first-letter,.mw-parser-output .fnumber-fallback .first-letter{font-style:italic;font-family:Trebuchet MS,Candara,Georgia,Calibri,Corbel,serif}.mw-parser-output span.fnumber.noitalic::first-letter,.mw-parser-output .fnumber-fallback.noitalic .first-letter{font-style:normal;font-family:inherit}f/2, note there is no "ROKKOR" engraving	Dropped "Rokkor" branding; sometimes referred to as "Plain MD". Mechanical lock added to aperture ring to secure the aperture ring at minimum value.
MD	MD (IIIa)	1985 – 1996		Possibly rebranded lenses built by a third-party manufacturer, lacking features compared to MD (III).

== List of lenses ==
Interchangeable Minolta lenses for 35mm SR-mount cameras
FL (mm)	Apr.	Name	SR/ AR (Note: Original line of lenses for Minolta SR mount with preset or manual (SR) and automatic (AR) diaphragm mechanisms)	MC (Note: Meter-Coupled mount, identified by presence of MC tab on aperture ring; includes cosmetic variant "MC Rokkor-X", which uses a rubber inset on the focusing ring instead of all-metal focusing rings.)	MD (Note: Adds second tab on the aperture ring to signal the body when the minimum aperture has been set, for shutter-priority autoexposure.)	Construction		Min. Focus	Dimensions			Notes
FL (mm)	Apr.	Name	SR/ AR	MC	MD	Ele	Grp	Min. Focus	Φ×L	Wgt.	Filter (mm)	Notes
Fisheye lenses
7.5	f/4–22	Fish-eye Rokkor	No	Yes	Yes	12	8	0.5 m (1 ft 8 in)	68×63 mm (2.7×2.5 in)	345 g (12.2 oz)	built-in	circular fisheye lens
16	f/2.8–16	Fish-eye Rokkor-OK	No	Yes	Yes	11	8	0.3 m (1 ft 0 in)	73×63.5 mm (2.9×2.5 in)	445 g (15.7 oz)	built-in	"full-frame" (diagonal) fisheye lens
16	f/2.8–22	Fish-eye Rokkor	No	No	Yes	10	7	0.25 m (9.8 in)	64.5×43 mm (2.5×1.7 in)	265 g (9.3 oz)	built-in	"full-frame" (diagonal) fisheye lens
18	f/9.5–22	UW Rokkor-PG	Yes	No	No	7	5	fixed	60×48 mm (2.4×1.9 in)	240 g (8.5 oz)	rear	"full-frame" (diagonal) fisheye lens
Ultra wide angle lenses
17	f/4–16	W Rokkor	No	Yes	Yes	12	9	0.25 m (9.8 in)	75×53 mm (3.0×2.1 in)	325 g (11.5 oz)	72	Retrofocus design
20	f/2.8–22	W Rokkor	No	No	Yes	10	9	0.25 m (9.8 in)	64.5×43.5 mm (2.5×1.7 in)	235 g (8.3 oz)	55	Retrofocus design with floating element
21	f/2.8–16	W Rokkor-NL	No	Yes	No	12	9	0.25 m (9.8 in)	75×66.9 mm (3.0×2.6 in)	510 g (18 oz)	72	Retrofocus design
21	f/4–16	W Rokkor-QH	Yes	No	No	8	4	0.9 m (2 ft 11 in)	60×20 mm (2.4×0.8 in)	166 g (5.9 oz)	55	symmetric lens, requires mirror lock-up
21	f/4.5–16	W Rokkor-PI	Yes	No	No	9	5	0.9 m (2 ft 11 in)				symmetric lens, requires mirror lock-up
Wide angle lenses
24	f/2.8-16	W Rokkor	No	Yes	Yes	9	7	0.3 m (1 ft 0 in)	65×50 mm (2.6×2.0 in)	275 g (9.7 oz)	55	Retrofocus design
24	f/2.8-22	MD	No	No	Yes	8	8	0.25 m (9.8 in)	64×39 mm (2.5×1.5 in)	200 g (7.1 oz)	49	Retrofocus design
24	f/2.8-16	W Rokkor VFC	No	Yes	Yes	9	7	0.3 m (1 ft 0 in)	67×50.5 mm (2.6×2.0 in)	340 g (12 oz)	55	Retrofocus design, with variable field curvature control
28	f/2–16	W Rokkor	No	Yes	Yes	10	9	0.3 m (1 ft 0 in)	65.5×61 mm (2.6×2.4 in)	345 g (12.2 oz)	55 (49) (Note: This lens also was available with a 49 mm filter thread with MD tab.)	Retrofocus design
28	f/2.5–16	W Rokkor-SI	No	Yes	No	9	7	0.5 m (1 ft 8 in)	64×61.5 mm (2.5×2.4 in)	364 g (12.8 oz)	55	Retrofocus design
28	f/2.8–16	W Rokkor	No	Yes	Yes	7	7	0.3 m (1 ft 0 in)	64.5×43.5 mm (2.5×1.7 in)	205 g (7.2 oz)	55 (49)	Retrofocus design;
28	f/2.8–22	Celtic	No	No	Yes	7	7	0.3 m (1 ft 0 in)	64.5×43.5 mm (2.5×1.7 in)	240 g (8.5 oz)	55	Retrofocus design
28	f/3.5–16	W Rokkor-SG	Yes	Yes	No	7	7	0.6 m (2 ft 0 in)	63.5×45 mm (2.5×1.8 in)	245 g (8.6 oz)	55	Retrofocus design
28	f/3.5–16	Celtic	No	Yes	No	7	7	0.6 m (2 ft 0 in)	63×45 mm (2.5×1.8 in)	260 g (9.2 oz)	55	Retrofocus design
28	f/3.5–16	W Rokkor-PE	No	Yes	Yes	5	5	0.3 m (1 ft 0 in)	64×40 mm (2.5×1.6 in)	170 g (6.0 oz)	49	Retrofocus design
35	f/1.8–16	W Rokkor-HH	No	Yes	Yes	8	6	0.3 m (1 ft 0 in)	66×67.6 mm (2.6×2.7 in)	420 g (15 oz)	55 (49)	Retrofocus design;
35	f/2.8–16	W Rokkor-HG	Yes	Yes	No	7	6	0.4 m (1 ft 4 in)	63×45 mm (2.5×1.8 in)	215 g (7.6 oz)	55	Retrofocus design
35	f/2.8–16	W Rokkor	No	Yes	Yes	5	5	0.3 m (1 ft 0 in)	64.5×41.5 mm (2.5×1.6 in)	200 g (7.1 oz)	55 (49)	Retrofocus design
35	f/2.8–22	Celtic	No	Yes	Yes	5	5	0.3 m (1 ft 0 in)	64.5×41.5 mm (2.5×1.6 in)	220 g (7.8 oz)	55	Retrofocus design
35	f/2.8–22	Shift CA Rokkor	No	Yes	Yes	9	7	0.3 m (1 ft 0 in)	83.5×71.5 mm (3.3×2.8 in)	560 g (20 oz)	55	Retrofocus design, includes variable field curvature control (VFC)
35	f/4–22	W Rokkor-QE	Yes	No	No	5	4	0.4 m (1 ft 4 in)	60×34 mm (2.4×1.3 in)	182 g (6.4 oz)	55	Retrofocus design
Normal lenses
45	f/2–16	Rokkor	No	No	Yes	6	5	0.6 m (2 ft 0 in)	64×30.5 mm (2.5×1.2 in)	125 g (4.4 oz)	49	
45	f/2.8–16	Rokkor-TD	Yes	No	No	4	3	0.9 m (2 ft 11 in)	?×16 mm (0.64 in)	130 g (4.6 oz)	46	Tessar-type
50	f/1.2–16	Rokkor	No	No	Yes	7	6	0.45 m (1 ft 6 in)	65×46 mm (2.6×1.8 in)	310 g (11 oz)	55	
50	f/1.4–16	Rokkor	No	Yes	Yes	7	5	0.45 m (1 ft 6 in)	64×40 mm (2.5×1.6 in)	230 g (8.1 oz)	55	
50	f/1.4–16	Rokkor	No	No	Yes	7	6	0.45 m (1 ft 6 in)	64×40 mm (2.5×1.6 in)	235 g (8.3 oz)	49	
50	f/1.7–16	Rokkor-PF	No	Yes	Yes	6	5	0.5 m (1 ft 8 in)				
50	f/1.7–16	Rokkor	No	No	Yes	6	5	0.45 m (1 ft 6 in)	64×40 mm (2.5×1.6 in)	185 g (6.5 oz)	55 (49)	
50	f/2–16	Rokkor	No	Yes	Yes	6	5	0.45 m (1 ft 6 in)	64×36 mm (2.5×1.4 in)	155 g (5.5 oz)	49	
53	f/2–16	Rokkor-PF	Yes	No	No	6	5	0.5 m (1 ft 8 in)				
55	f/1.7–16/22	Rokkor-PF	No	Yes	No	6	5	0.5 m (1 ft 8 in)	63×37.5 mm (2.5×1.5 in)	225 g (7.9 oz)	55	multiple versions with different minimum aperture
55	f/1.9–16	Rokkor	No	Yes	No	6	5	0.45 m (1 ft 6 in)	54×37.5 mm (2.1×1.5 in)	225 g (7.9 oz)	52	
55	f/1.8–16/22	Rokkor-PF	Yes	No	No	6	5	0.5 m (1 ft 8 in)				multiple versions with different minimum aperture
55	f/2–16/22	Rokkor-PF	Yes	No	No	6	5	0.5 m (1 ft 8 in)	?×36 mm (1.4 in)	210 g (7.5 oz)	52	multiple versions with different minimum aperture
58	f/1.2–16	Rokkor-PG	No	Yes	No	7	5	0.6 m (2 ft 0 in)	72×54 mm (2.8×2.1 in)	455 g (16.0 oz)	55	
58	f/1.4–16	Rokkor-PF	Yes	Yes	No	6	5	0.6 m (2 ft 0 in)	65×41.5 mm (2.6×1.6 in)	275 g (9.7 oz)	55	
Portrait lenses
85	f/1.7–22	Tele Rokkor-PF	No	Yes	No	6	5	1 m (3 ft 3 in)	73×62 mm (2.9×2.4 in)	460 g (16 oz)	55	
85	f/2–22	Rokkor	No	No	Yes	6	5	0.85 m (2 ft 9 in)	64×53.5 mm (2.5×2.1 in)	285 g (10.1 oz)	49	
85	f/2.8–16	Varisoft Rokkor	No	No	Yes	6	5	0.8 m (2 ft 7 in)	70×80 mm (2.8×3.1 in)	430 g (15 oz)	55	
100	f/2–22	Tele Rokkor-PF	Yes	Yes	No	6	5	1.2 m (3 ft 11 in)	?×64 mm (2.52 in)	430 g (15 oz)	62	
100	f/2.5–22	Tele Rokkor-PF	No	Yes	No	6	5	1.2 m (3 ft 11 in)	64.5×68.5 mm (2.5×2.7 in)	410 g (14 oz)	55	
100	f/2.5–22	Tele Rokkor-PE	No	Yes	Yes	5	5	1 m (3 ft 3 in)	64.5×64.5 mm (2.5×2.5 in)	365 g (12.9 oz)	55 (49)	
100	f/3.5–22	Tele Rokkor-QE	Yes	Yes	No	5	4	1.2 m (3 ft 11 in)	63×54 mm (2.5×2.1 in)	240 g (8.5 oz)	52	
100	f/4–22	Tele Rokkor-TC	Yes	No	No	3	3	1.2 m (3 ft 11 in)	56×80 mm (2.2×3.1 in)	240 g (8.5 oz)	46	preset aperture
135	f/2–22	Rokkor	No	No	Yes	6	5	1.3 m (4 ft 3 in)	79×96 mm (3.1×3.8 in)	725 g (25.6 oz)	72	
135	f/2.8–22	Tele Rokkor-PF	Yes	Yes	No	6	5	1.5 m (4 ft 11 in)	67.5×93.5 mm (2.7×3.7 in)	425 g (15.0 oz)	55	
135	f/2.8–22	Tele Rokkor-PG	Yes	No	No	7	5	1.2 m (3 ft 11 in)				
135	f/2.8–22	Tele Rokkor-QD	No	Yes	Yes	4	4	1.5 m (4 ft 11 in)	64.5×89.5 mm (2.5×3.5 in)	510 g (18 oz)	55	
135	f/2.8–22	Rokkor	No	No	Yes	5	5	1.5 m (4 ft 11 in)	64×81 mm (2.5×3.2 in)	385 g (13.6 oz)	55	
135	f/2.8–22	Celtic	No	Yes	No	5	4	1.5 m (4 ft 11 in)	64.2×100.5 mm (2.5×4.0 in)	610 g (22 oz)	55	
135	f/2.8–22	Celtic	No	No	Yes	4	4	1.5 m (4 ft 11 in)	64.5×89.5 mm (2.5×3.5 in)	535 g (18.9 oz)	55	
135	f/3.5–22	Tele Rokkor-QD	No	Yes	Yes	4	4	1.5 m (4 ft 11 in)	64.5×88.5 mm (2.5×3.5 in)	400 g (14 oz)	52	
135	f/3.5–22	Rokkor	No	No	Yes	5	5	1.5 m (4 ft 11 in)	64×72.5 mm (2.5×2.9 in)	285 g (10.1 oz)	49	
135	f/3.5–22	Celtic	No	Yes	Yes	4	4	1.5 m (4 ft 11 in)	64.5×88.5 mm (2.5×3.5 in)	410 g (14 oz)	55	
135	f/4–22	Tele Rokkor-TC	Yes	No	No	3	3	1.5 m (4 ft 11 in)	56×115 mm (2.2×4.5 in)	375 g (13.2 oz)	46	preset aperture
Telephoto lenses
180	f/2.5–22	Tele Rokkor-PF	Yes	No	No	6	5	2.5 m (8 ft 2 in)				preset aperture
200	f/2.8–32	Rokkor	No	No	Yes	5	5	1.8 m (5 ft 11 in)	78×133 mm (3.1×5.2 in)	700 g (25 oz)	72	
200	f/3.5–22	Tele Rokkor-QF	Yes	Yes	No	6	4	2.5 m (8 ft 2 in)	65×137.5 mm (2.6×5.4 in)	720 g (25 oz)	62	
200	f/4–22	Tele Rokkor	No	Yes	Yes	5	5	2.5 m (8 ft 2 in)	64.5×131 mm (2.5×5.2 in)	515 g (18.2 oz)	55	
200	f/4–32	Celtic	No	Yes	No	6	5	2.5 m (8 ft 2 in)	65.6×130.5 mm (2.6×5.1 in)	595 g (21.0 oz)	55	
200	f/4–32	Celtic	No	No	Yes	5	5	2.5 m (8 ft 2 in)	64.5×130 mm (2.5×5.1 in)	535 g (18.9 oz)	55	
200	f/4.5–22	Tele Rokkor-PE	No	Yes	No	5	5	2.5 m (8 ft 2 in)	64.5×130 mm (2.5×5.1 in)	500 g (18 oz)	52	
200	f/5–22	Tele Rokkor-QE	Yes	No	No	5	4	5.5 m (18 ft)	?×151 mm (5.96 in)	430 g (15.1 oz)	52	preset aperture
250	f/4–22	Tele Rokkor-QF	Yes	No	No	6	4	3 m (9.8 ft)				preset aperture
250	f/5.6	Rokkor RF	No	No	Yes	6	5	2.5 m (8 ft 2 in)	66.5×58 mm (2.6×2.3 in)	250 g (8.8 oz)	rear	catadioptric
300	f/4.5–32	Tele Rokkor-TD	Yes	No	No	4	3	4.5 m (15 ft)				preset aperture
300	f/4.5–32	Tele Rokkor-QD	Yes	No	No	4	4	4.5 m (15 ft)	?×250 mm (10 in)	1,000 g (36 oz)	77	preset aperture
300	f/4.5–22	Tele Rokkor-HF	No	Yes	No	6	6	4.5 m (15 ft)	80×199.5 mm (3.1×7.9 in)	1,150 g (41 oz)	72	
300	f/4.5–32	Rokkor	No	No	Yes	7	6	3 m (9.8 ft)	77.5×177.5 mm (3.1×7.0 in)	705 g (24.9 oz)	72	
300	f/5.6–32	Tele Rokkor-QD	Yes	No	No	4	4	4.5 m (15 ft)	?×200 mm (7.88 in)	540 g (19.2 oz)	62	preset aperture
300	f/5.6–22	Tele Rokkor-PE	No	Yes	Yes	5	5	4.5 m (15 ft)	65×186 mm (2.6×7.3 in)	695 g (24.5 oz)	55	
400	f/5.6–22	APO Tele Rokkor-PE	No	Yes	Yes	7	6	5 m (16 ft)	83×256.5 mm (3.3×10.1 in)	1,440 g (51 oz)	72	includes CaF_{2} element
500	f/8	RF Rokkor	No	No	Yes	6	5	4 m (13 ft)	83×98.5 mm (3.3×3.9 in)	600 g (21 oz)	rear	catadioptric
600	f/5.6–45	Tele Rokkor-TD	Yes	No	No	4	3	10 m (33 ft)	132×530 mm (5.2×20.9 in)	4,700 g (170 oz)	126	preset aperture
600	f/6.3–32	APO Tele Rokkor	No	No	Yes	9	8	5 m (16 ft)	108.5×373.5 mm (4.3×14.7 in)	2,400 g (85 oz)	built-in	includes CaF_{2} element
800	f/8	RF Rokkor	No	Yes	Yes	8	7	8 m (26 ft)	125×166.5 mm (4.9×6.6 in)	1,500 g (53 oz)	built-in (rear) (Note: Updated version uses rear-mounted filters.)	catadioptric
1000	f/6.3	RF Rokkor	Yes	Yes	No	7	6	30 m (98 ft)	217×594.5 mm (8.5×23.4 in)	10.6 kg (23 lb)	built-in (49)	catadioptric
1600	f/11	RF Rokkor	No	Yes	No	7	6	21 m (69 ft)				catadioptric
1600	f/11	RF Rokkor	No	No	Yes	6	5	20 m (66 ft)	178×322.5 mm (7.0×12.7 in)	6,850 g (242 oz)	built-in (rear)	catadioptric
Zoom lenses
24-35	f/3.5–22	Zoom Rokkor	No	No	Yes	10	10	0.73 m (2 ft 5 in)	67×50 mm (2.6×2.0 in)	285 g (10.1 oz)	55	
24-50	f/4–22	Zoom Rokkor	No	No	Yes	13	11	0.7 m (2 ft 4 in)	75×69.5 mm (3.0×2.7 in)	390 g (14 oz)	72	
28-70	f/3.5(4.8)–22	Zoom Rokkor	No	No	Yes	8	8	0.8 m (2 ft 7 in)				In partnership with Cosina
28-85	f/3.5(4.5)–22	Zoom Rokkor	No	No	Yes	13	10	0.8 m (2 ft 7 in)	65.5×86.5 mm (2.6×3.4 in)	470 g (17 oz)	55	In partnership with Tokina
35-70	f/3.5–22	Zoom Rokkor	No	No	Yes	8	7	1 m (3 ft 3 in)	69×54.4 mm (2.7×2.1 in)	355 g (12.5 oz)	55	
35-70	f/3.5(4.8)–22	Zoom Rokkor	No	No	Yes	7	7	0.5 m (1 ft 8 in)				In partnership with Cosina
35-105	f/3.5(4.5)–22	Zoom Rokkor	No	No	Yes	14	12	1.5 m (4 ft 11 in)	65×90.5 mm (2.6×3.6 in)	480 g (17 oz)	55	In partnership with Tokina
35-135	f/3.5(4.5)–22	Zoom Rokkor	No	No	Yes	14	12	1.5 m (4 ft 11 in)	64×100 mm (2.5×3.9 in)	510 g (18 oz)	55	In partnership with Tokina
40-80	f/2.8–22	Zoom Rokkor	No	Yes	Yes	12	12	1 m (3 ft 3 in)	66×93.5×98.5 mm (2.6×3.7×3.9 in)	560 g (20 oz)	55	
50-100	f/3.5–16	Zoom Rokkor	Yes	No	No	15	9	2 m (6 ft 7 in)	82×126 mm (3.2×5.0 in)	855 g (30.2 oz)	77	
50-135	f/3.5–22	Zoom Rokkor	No	No	Yes	12	10	1.5 m (4 ft 11 in)	68.5×118 mm (2.7×4.6 in)	480 g (17 oz)	55	
70-210	f/4–22	Zoom Rokkor	No	No	Yes	12	9	1.1 m (3 ft 7 in)	72×153 mm (2.8×6.0 in)	635 g (22.4 oz)	55	
70-210	f/4.5(5.6)–22	Zoom Rokkor	No	No	Yes	12	9	1.2 m (3 ft 11 in)				
70-300	f/4.5(5.8)–22	Zoom Rokkor	No	No	Yes	13	9	1.5 m (4 ft 11 in)				In partnership with Cosina
75-150	f/4–32	Zoom Rokkor	No	No	Yes	12	8	1.2 m (3 ft 11 in)	64×113.5 mm (2.5×4.5 in)	445 g (15.7 oz)	49	
75-200	f/4.5–22	Zoom Rokkor	No	No	Yes	15	13	1.2 m (3 ft 11 in)	70×155 mm (2.8×6.1 in)	640 g (23 oz)	55	
80-160	f/3.5–22	Zoom Rokkor	Yes	No	No	15	10	2.5 m (8 ft 2 in)	84×207 mm (3.3×8.1 in)	1,350 g (48 oz)	77	
80-200	f/4.5–22	Zoom Rokkor	No	Yes	Yes	14	10	1.8 m (5 ft 11 in)	74×156 mm (2.9×6.1 in)	690 g (24 oz)	55	
100-200	f/5.6–22	Zoom Rokkor	Yes	Yes	Yes	8	5	2 m (6 ft 7 in)	58×175 mm (2.3×6.9 in)	535 g (18.9 oz)	52	Early versions had manual diaphragm.
100-200	f/5.6–22	Celtic	No	Yes	Yes	8	5	2.5 m (8 ft 2 in)	63.5×173 mm (2.5×6.8 in)	570 g (20 oz)	55	
100-300	f/5.6–32	Zoom Rokkor	No	No	Yes	13	10	1.5 m (4 ft 11 in)	72×187 mm (2.8×7.4 in)	700 g (25 oz)	55	In partnership with Tokina
100-300	f/5.6(6.7)–22	Zoom Rokkor	No	No	Yes	10	8	1.5 m (4 ft 11 in)				
100-500	f/8–32	Zoom Rokkor	No	Yes	Yes	16	10	2.5 m (8 ft 2 in)	91×330 mm (3.6×13.0 in)	2,030 g (72 oz)	72	
100-500	f/8–32	APO Tele Zoom Rokkor	No	No	Yes	16	11	2.5 m (8 ft 2 in)	90.5×331.5 mm (3.6×13.1 in)	2,080 g (73 oz)	72	
160-500	f/8–22	Zoom Rokkor	Yes	No	No	16	11	4.5 m (15 ft)	87×490 mm (3.4×19.3 in)	2,750 g (97 oz)	77	
Specialty (close-up and macro) lenses
12.5	f/2–16	Bellows Micro Rokkor	No	No	Yes	4	4	—	33×23.5 mm (1.3×0.9 in)	40 g (1.4 oz)	gelatin	
25	f/2.5–16	Bellows Micro Rokkor	No	No	Yes	6	4	—	33.5×17 mm (1.3×0.7 in)	40 g (1.4 oz)	gelatin	
50	f/3.5–32	Auto Bellows Rokkor	No	No	Yes	6	4	—	57×24.5 mm (2.2×1.0 in)	110 g (3.9 oz)	55 / gelatin	
50	f/3.5–22	Macro Rokkor-QF	Yes	Yes	Yes	6	4	0.23 m (9.1 in)	68.5×55.5 mm (2.7×2.2 in)	330 g (12 oz)	55	
50	f/3.5–22	MC Macro Celtic	No	Yes	No	6	4	0.23 m (9.1 in)	66.5×55.5 mm (2.6×2.2 in)	325 g (11.5 oz)	55	
100	f/3.5–22	Macro Rokkor-QE	No	Yes	Yes	5	4	0.45 m (1 ft 6 in)	57×85 mm (2.2×3.3 in)	550 g (19 oz)	52	
100	f/3.5–22	Macro Rokkor	No	Yes	Yes	5	4	0.45 m (1 ft 6 in)	74.5×88.5 mm (2.9×3.5 in)	600 g (21 oz)	55	
100	f/4–32	Bellows Rokkor-TC	No	Yes	Yes	3	3	—	64×35 mm (2.5×1.4 in)	165 g (5.8 oz)	55	
100	f/4–32	Macro Rokkor	No	No	Yes	5	4	0.45 m (1 ft 6 in)	66×88.5 mm (2.6×3.5 in)	385 g (13.6 oz)	55	
100	f/4–32	Auto Bellows Rokkor	No	No	Yes	5	4	—	57×28.5 mm (2.2×1.1 in)	145 g (5.1 oz)	55 / gelatin	
135	f/4–22	Bellows Rokkor-TC	Yes	No	No	3	3	—	56×55 mm (2.2×2.2 in)	200 g (7.1 oz)	46	
