= Minolta AF Fish-Eye 16mm f/2.8 =

Still-photography camera lens

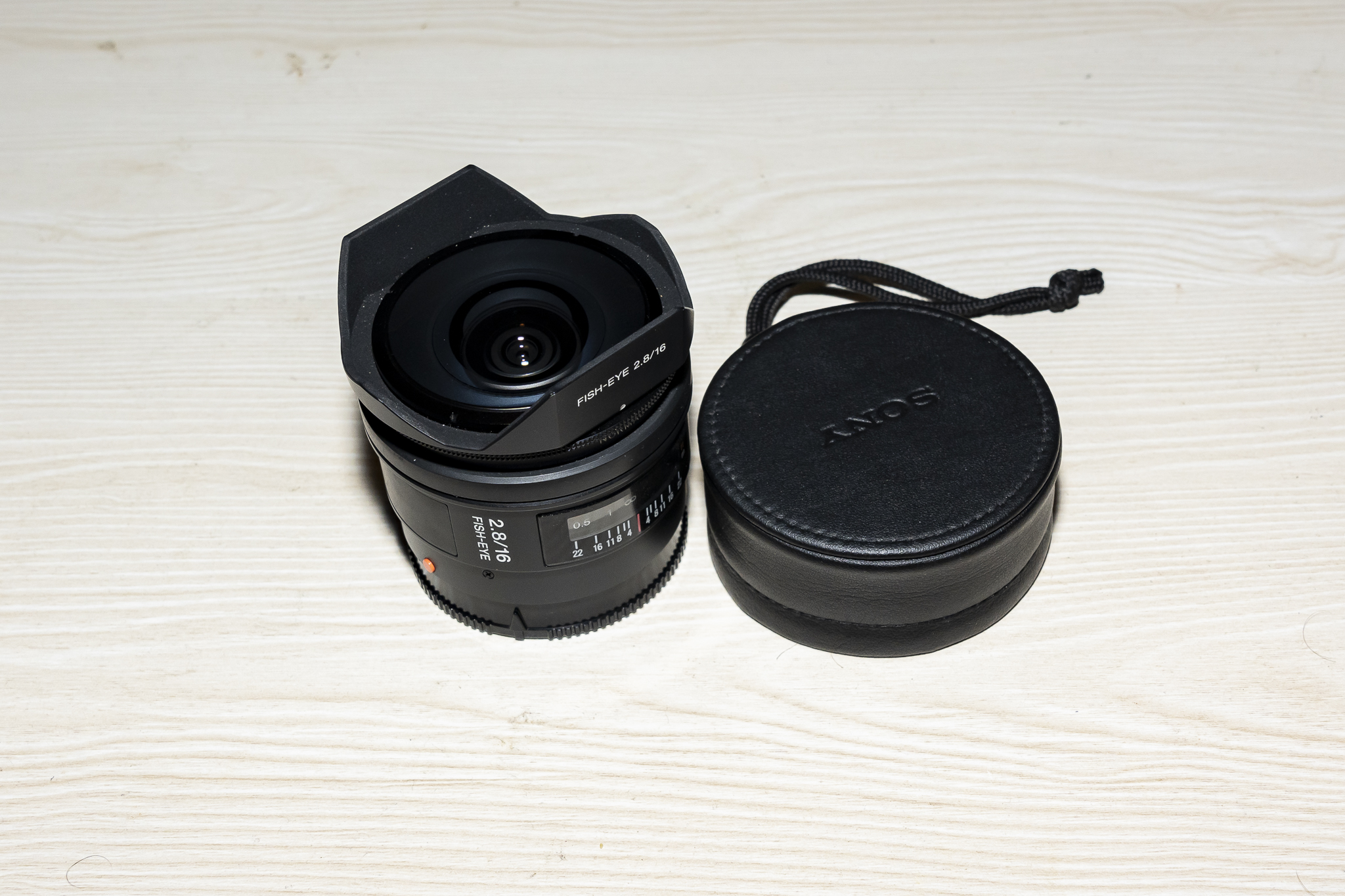
- Maker: Minolta, Sony

Technical data
- Focal length: 16mm
- Aperture (max/min): f/2.8-f/22
- Close focus distance: 0.20m
- Max. magnification: 1/1.6
- Construction: 11 elements in 8 groups

Features
- Ultrasonic motor: No No
- Macro capable: No No
- Unique features: Fisheye

Physical
- Weight: 400g
- Filter diameter: Integrated

Accessories
- Lens hood: Integrated Flower

Angle of view
- Horizontal: 180°

History
- Introduction: 1986
- Predecessor: Fish-Eye Rokkor 16mm f/2.8
- Successor: Minolta version succeeded by Sony version in 2006

Retail info
- MSRP: 1000 USD (as of 2006)

Originally produced by Minolta, and currently produced by Sony, the AF Fish-Eye 16mm, is a prime Fisheye lens compatible with cameras using the Minolta A-mount and Sony A-mount lens mounts. It is a full-frame fisheye lens with a 180° viewing angle.

The front of the lens does not have a mount for filters. Rather a number of filters are built in: Normal, 056, B12, and either FLW (in older versions) or A12 (in newer versions). The filters are selected by a rotating dial on the body of the lens.

== See also ==
- List of Minolta A-mount lenses

== Sources ==
- Dyxum lens data
