= Minolta A-mount system =

Line of photographic equipment from Minolta

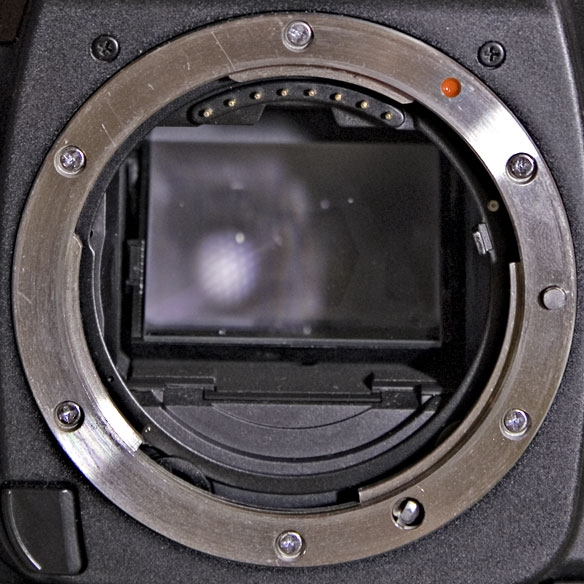
The 2nd Generation Minolta A-mount

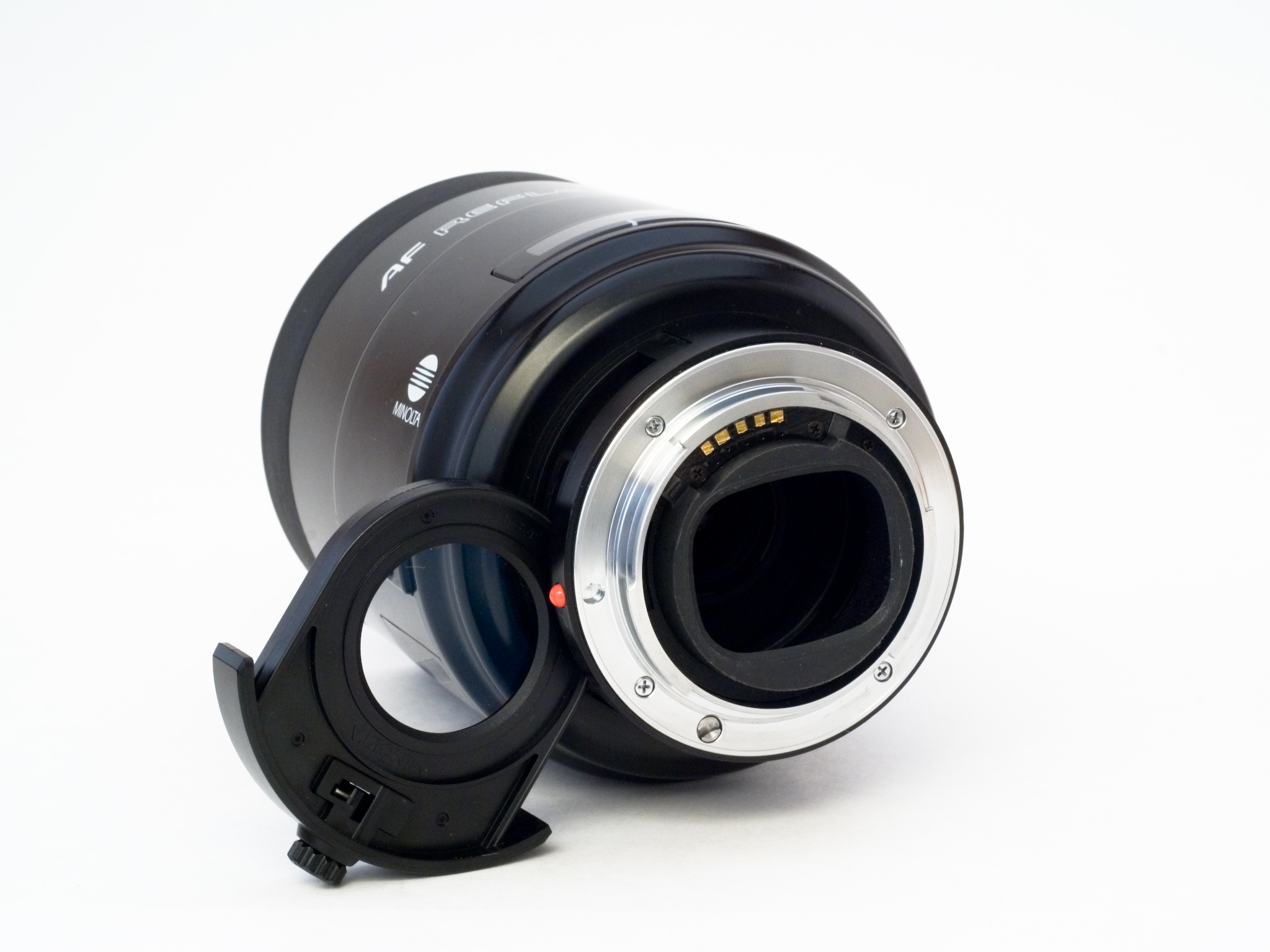
The lens side of the mount.

The Minolta A-mount camera system was a line of photographic equipment from Minolta introduced in 1985 with the world's first integrated autofocus system in the camera body with interchangeable lenses. The system used a lens mount called A-mount, with a flange focal distance 44.50 mm, one millimeter longer, 43.5 mm, than the previous SR mount from 1958. The new mount was wider, 49.7 mm vs. 44.97 mm, than the older SR-mount and due to the longer flange focal distance, old manual lenses were incompatible with the new system. Minolta bought the autofocus technology of Leica Correfot camera which was partly used on the a-mount autofocus technology. The mount is now used by Sony, who bought the SLR camera division from Konica Minolta, Konica and Minolta having merged a few years before.

The Minolta A-mount system was at first marketed as Maxxum in North America and α (Alpha) in Japan and the rest of Asia. In Europe, early Minolta A-mount cameras were initially identified by a 4 digit number followed by AF. The name Dynax was introduced later with the "i" cameras, the second generation of Minolta A-mount camera.

It was originally based around a selection of three 35 mm single-lens reflex (SLR) bodies, the 5000, 7000 and 9000. The system also included an extensive range of auto-focus lenses, flashes, a motor drive and other accessories. Compatible equipment was made by a number of third parties. The mount itself was both electronically communicating with the lens as well as used a mechanical arm to control aperture and a screw-type drive to control focusing.

In the following years, many different cameras and accessories were added to the range.

The last film-based AF SLRs produced by Minolta were the Maxxum 50 (a.k.a. Dynax 30 and Dynax 40) and the Maxxum 70 (a.k.a. Dynax 60 and α-70). The Dynax/Maxxum/α branding was also used on two Konica Minolta digital SLRs, prior to the acquisition by Sony (7D, 5D).

When Sony acquired Konica Minolta's camera technologies in 2006 they chose the "α" brand name (already in use by Minolta in Asia) for their new "Sony α" digital SLR system. The Dynax/Maxxum/α lens mount (which was retained from the old cameras) is now officially part of the "α mount system".

== Film SLR bodies ==
=== Timeline ===
Class	1985	1986	1987	1988	1989	1990	1991	1992	1993	1994	1995	1996	1997	1998	1999	2000	2001	2002	2003	2004	2005	2006
Higher flagship	9000 AF							9xi						9/9Ti								
Higher flagship																7						
Higher flagship																	7 Limited					
Lower flagship													800si									
Enthusiast	7000 AF				7000i																	
Enthusiast							8000i															
Enthusiast							7xi															
Enthusiast									700si													
Higher entry-Level		5000			5000i																	
Higher entry-Level								5xi														
Higher entry-Level										400si												
Higher entry-Level											500si			505si			5					
Higher entry-Level											600si classic			505si super								
Higher entry-Level																				70/60		
Lower entry-Level
Lower entry-Level					3000i																	
Lower entry-Level							3xi															
Lower entry-Level						2xi																
Lower entry-Level											300si				404si			4				
Lower entry-Level																			3			
Lower entry-Level																				50/40		

=== First generation ===
==== 7000 ====
The Minolta 7000 was the first successful auto focus SLR using a motor integrated in the camera body. It was released in 1985 together with 11 lenses, 2 flashguns and a complete lineup of accessories. The 7000 featured one AF-sensor, shutter speeds of 1/2000 to 30 seconds, flash sync speed of 1/100s, exposure compensation of +/-4EV in 0.5 exposure steps, center-weighted light metering mode and two frames per second film advance. The Maxxum 7000, when first released had the crossed x's in the name Maxxum. Exxon had a registered trademark for the crossed x's and sued Minolta, forcing Minolta to change the way the name was shown.

==== 9000 ====
The Minolta 9000, a camera aimed at professionals, was released later the same year, and featured shutter speeds of 1/4000 to 30 seconds, center-weighted and spot light metering, exposure compensation of +-4EV in 0.5 exposure steps and a flash sync speed of 1/250s. Unlike the 7000, the 9000 had no internal motordrive and thus holds the position as the world's only autofocusing SLR with manual winding, but with the addition of the motor drive MD-90 a photographer could get up to 5 frames per second. The 9000 had a very extensive range of accessories, including several different backs, winding options and screens. The 9000 had a unique function in that, if combined with the Minolta Data Receiver DR-1000 and the Minolta Flash Meter IV, readings could be made on the flash meter and transferred wirelessly to the camera, and the camera then triggered from the flash meter.

==== 5000 ====
The Minolta 5000, Minolta's entry level camera and essentially a downscaled 7000, was released in 1986. It featured shutter speeds of 1/2000 to 4 seconds and BULB, center-weighted lightmetering, exposure compensation of +1EV, flashsync speed of 1/100s and fully automatic programs.

=== Second generation ===
==== 7000i ====
This camera had the usual Program automatic exposure, Shutter priority automatic exposure, Aperture-priority automatic exposure and metered manual exposure modes (standard on the 7000), TTL autoflash (like the 7000) and added a newer faster and more sensitive AF system, faster film advance, new flash hot-shoe that was incompatible with the older flash system (although an adapter was available and the 7/8000i supported the x000-era CG-1000 "flash handle" for backwards compatibility). The 7000i supported the Maxxum lens system, and other previously introduced accessories such as the remote cords.

Perhaps more innovative and unusual than any other improvement was the expansion card system. While also used in other models in the i-series, some models in the xi-series, and the 700si, the Minolta Creative Expansion Card System debuted on this model. The expansion card system provided a way to add features to the camera, such as multi-spot metering, or re-program the built-in AE modes to favor faster shutter speeds or smaller apertures, such as the sports action card. While most of the cards' functions and effects could be duplicated by a technically knowledgeable photographer using the camera without the expansion cards, the card system was handy for less technically skilled users who just wanted to photograph their child's soccer/football team for example, without needing to learn about exposure settings and the effect they might have on how a picture "looked". These cards were the forerunners of today's "picture/creativity modes". This camera was aimed at the same market as the 7000.

==== 5000i ====
Built-in flash with a zoom head, programmed AE and metered manual exposure out of the box, adding the A/S expansion card provided two additional AE modes, Shutter-priority and Aperture-priority. A fairly direct replacement for the earlier 5000.

==== 8000i ====
Essentially added a PC flash-sync terminal, ME capability, spot metering and faster shutter to the 7000i feature-set. This camera was not a direct replacement for the earlier 9000, and lacked some features such as depth-of-field preview, but offered some additional features that were not on the 7000i. This camera was available in white as well, together with matched white 35-105 lens and 5200i flash.

==== 3000i ====
An entry-level camera, exposure mode was program AE only, with a high-speed program option, no Creative Expansion Card support. An even more basic Maxxum, this camera was basically for the point-and-shoot user that wanted a system SLR camera with interchangeable lenses and more powerful flashes, but did not want the features on, or did not want to pay for the 5000i, 7000i, 8000i cameras.

=== Third generation ===
==== 2xi ====
An entry-level model, the plastic-bodied 2xi features a program mode (P-mode), Shutter priority mode (S-mode), aperture priority mode (A-mode), and fully manual mode (M-mode). There is also a self-timer feature, a manual / auto focus switch for use with the series of auto focus lenses, hot shoe mount compatible with i and xi flashes, and a tripod mount.

==== QTsi ====
Introduced in 1999. Also known as the Dynax 303si. An entry-level, plastic-bodied camera manufactured in Malaysia. Key specifications:

- Viewfinder: 90% field of view; 0.75X magnification
- Shutter speeds 30 to 1/2000th sec.; flash sync: 1/90th (1/45th with wireless flash)
- AF sensitivity range: EV -1 to 18 (ISO 100)
- AF control: single-shot, continuous, automatic AF-mode selection
- Exposure modes: P, five Subject Program modes (Portrait, Landscape, Close-up, Sports and Night Portrait)
- Metering range: EV 4-20 (ISO 100, f/1.4 lens)
- Film speed setting: Automatic: ISO 25 to 5000 using DX-coding; Flash: ISO 25-1000
- Drive modes: single frame, continuous (1 frame/sec.), self timer
- Built-in flash: GN 12 (ISO 100 in meters); 28mm angle of view; approx. 3 second recycling time
- Batteries: two CR2 lithium cells
- Dimensions: 135 x 90 x 58.5mm
- Weight: 340g (w/o batteries)

==== 5xi ====
- Type: 35 mm SLR with autofocus, autoexposure, built-in motor drive and flash.
- Format: 24 × 35 mm cartridge film.
- Lenses: Minolta AF, Minolta AFxi.
- Lens mount: Minolta A-type bayonet mount.
- Viewfinder: Eye-level pentaprism, 92% (vertical), 94% (horizontal) coverage.
- Focusing screen: Acute-Matte, fixed.
- Viewfinder information: Focus/spot metering frames, flash on/ready indicators; camera shake warning; focus signal; shutter speed and aperture LEDs; exposure compensation warning; spot metering indicator.
- Metering system: 8-segment honeycomb metering, spot metering.
- Exposure modes: Program AE with shift, aperture-priority, shutter-priority, metered manual.
- Metering range: EV0-20 (honeycomb); EV3-20 (spot).
- Film speed setting: DX coding, lSO 25-5000 in 1/3step increments. Non-DX coded film defaults to ISO 100.
- Autofocus system: TTL phase-detection system with horizontal CCD array; activated by eye-start. Built-in (flash) AF illuminator, range 1–5 m.
- Focus modes: Single shot, predictive; powered manual.
- Shutter: Electronically controlled vertical-travel focal-plane type.
- Shutter speeds: 1/2000s - 30sec, plus bulb in 1/2 stop increments.
- Flash: Built-in retractable type, GN 14 (Metric, ISO 100). Flash activates automatically when needed in P mode, otherwise when popped up. Flash will only combine with external flash when used off-camera.
- Flash synchronisation: 1/90s (P,A modes), 1/60s (S mode). Slow-shutter synch possible by pressing spot metering button.
- Self-timer: Electronic, 10-second delay, cancellable. When raised, flash pulses as warning before shutter releases.
- Film transport: Auto to first frame, single frame advance or continuous 1 fps. Auto rewind at end of roll (film wound right back into cassette).
- Exposure compensation: +/- 4 stops in half stop increments.
- Automatic exposure bracketing: Possible via EB Card.
- Multiple exposure: Possible via ME Card.
- Creative expansion cards: Travel, child, depth control, sports action, portrait, close-up, multiple exposure, exposure bracketing, flash bracketing.
- Power source: 2CR5 6V lithium battery.
- Dimensions: 153(W) × 99(H) × 69(D) mm.
- Weight: 575 g (with battery, without lens).

==== 7xi ====
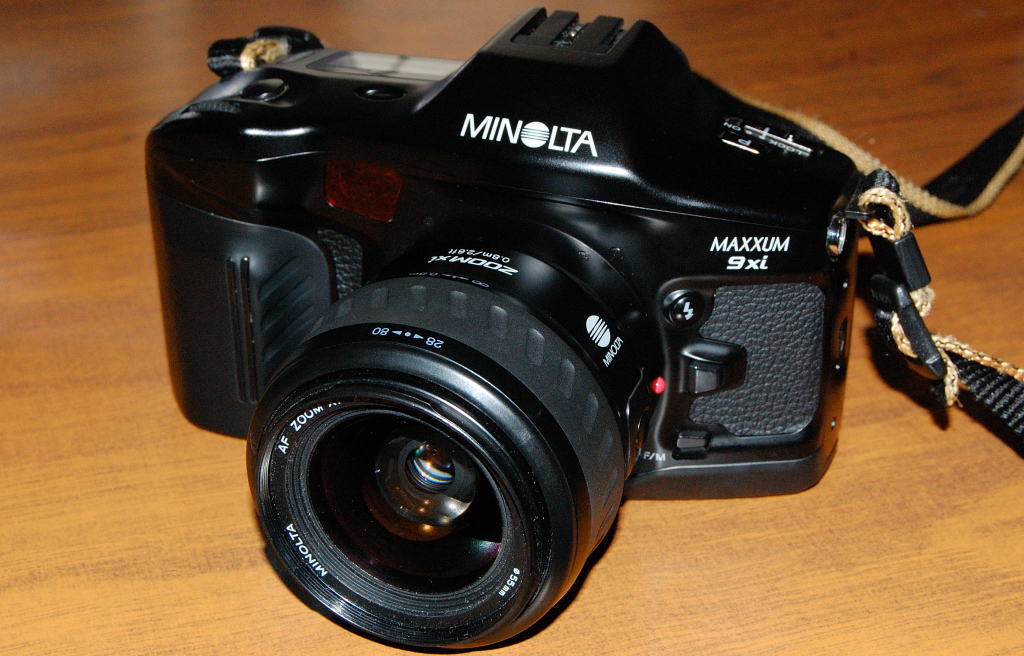
9xi

==== 9xi ====
The Minolta 9xi was the flagship of the xi series cameras. At its time, the fastest camera in the world; shortest shutter time 1/12000, 4,5 fps without an add on winder. Add on battery pack was available.

=== Fourth generation ===
==== 300si ====
This camera is known by several names and variations, it features full automatic program, and 5 preset programs. Manual control is not an option. It has a prominent visible built in flash and was released in 1995, the ISO settings range 25-5000, the focal plane shutter speeds: 30 seconds - 1/2000. It is considered an entry-level camera because of the lack of manual, shutter, or aperture, priority capability.

==== 350si ====
A version of the 300si offering an additional panoramic mode with part of the viewfinder and film opening masked off top and bottom. This can be selected by a switch while there is film in the camera, so that a film may contain a mixture of normal and panoramic pictures. Sold as the Alpha 101si in Japan.

==== 500si/550si panorama date ====
The Minolta Dynax 500si (European name) was introduced in 1994. Budget version of Minolta Dynax 700si with built-in programs instead of program cards

==== 505si/505si super ====
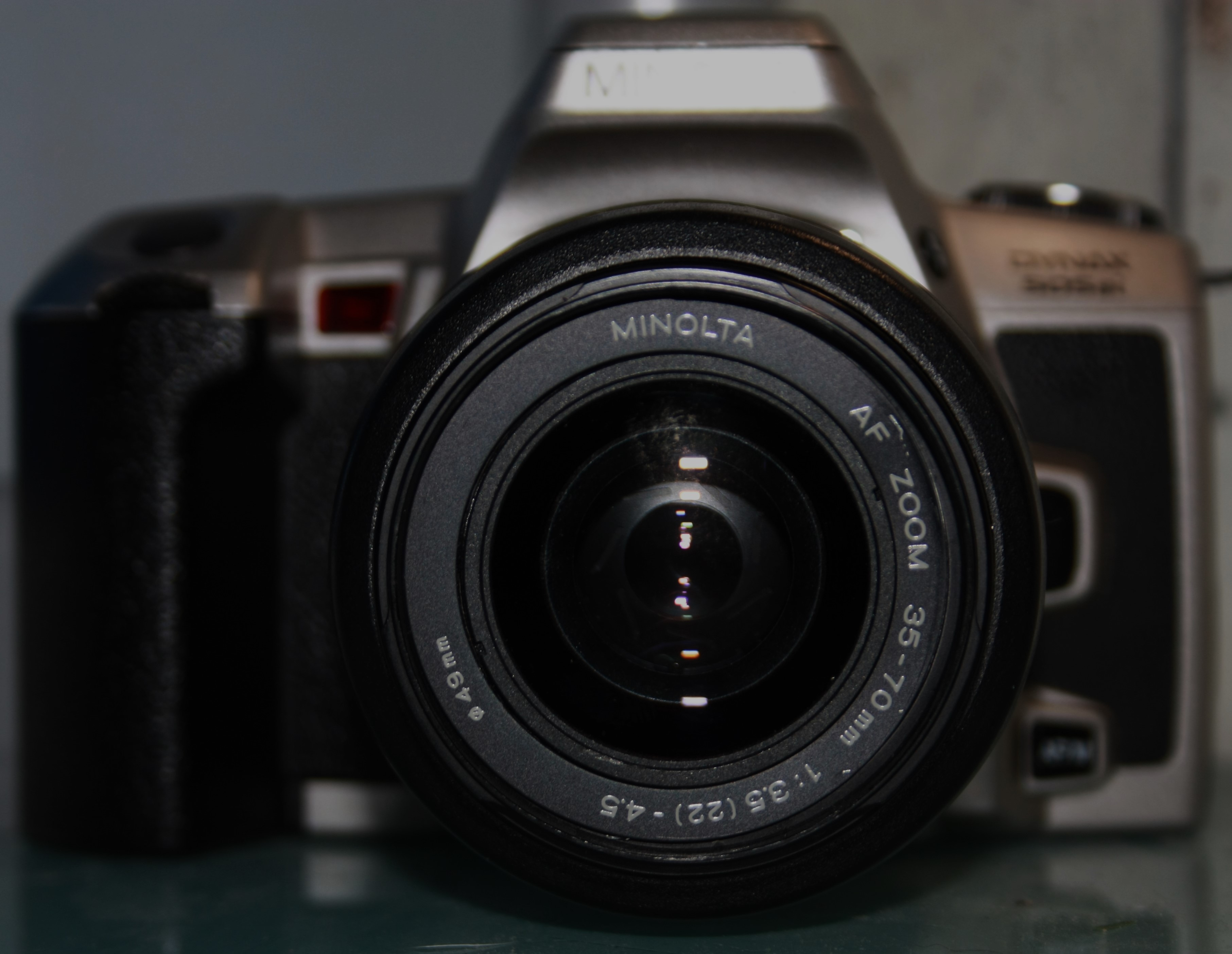
Minolta 505si and its 35-70 f/3.5-4.5 kit lens

==== 600si ====
The Minolta 600si Classic (a.k.a. Maxxum 600si and α-507si), introduced in 1995, featured classic controls for most functions. This meant that the 600si had many dials and knobs rather than a menu system. The top plate of the camera included separate dials for exposure compensation, flash compensation, exposure mode and drive mode, and other functions were controlled by further knobs elsewhere. The advantage to the photographer was that almost all settings were readily identified even when the camera was not switched on - just like a classic camera.

The 600si did not have a P (panic) mode to reset all functions, nor was it possible to store favourite combinations of settings or use cards from the 700si card system. The 600si could be used with the VC-600 vertical control grip for a second set of controls and additional battery options.

==== 650si ====
The 650si was effectively a 600si with the addition of date/time imprinting and a built-in panorama mask, restricting the film image to 12 mm × 36 mm.

==== 800si ====
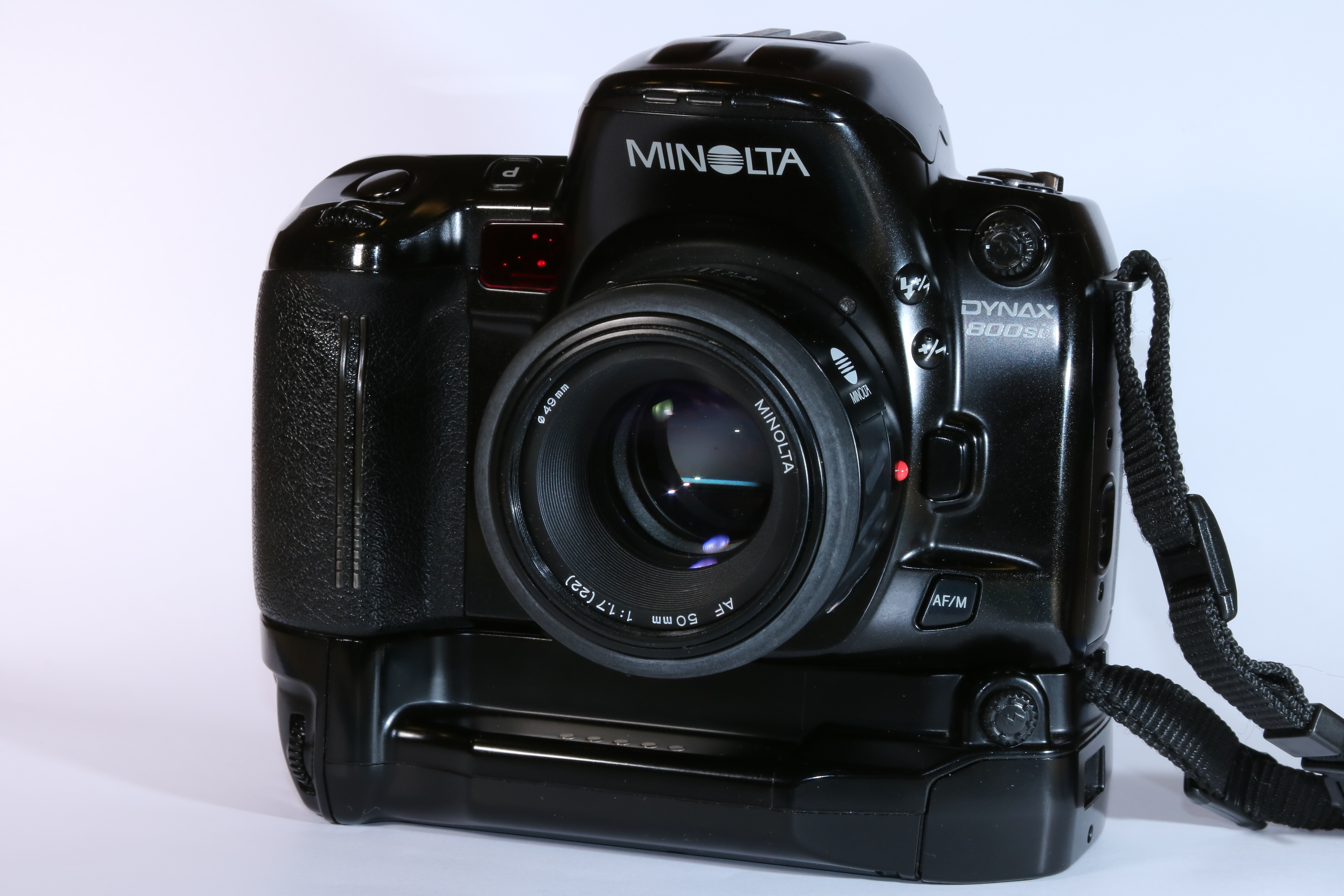
Minolta Maxxum 800si with VC-700 grip and 50 mm f/1.7 lens

The Minolta 800si, released in 1997, was the flagship of the si series cameras before the 5th generation single digit series. It can be seen as a stop-gap measure to fill the "semi-pro" niche between the 1993 700si and the 2000 Dynax 7. This camera has a very high powered pop-up flash, one of the most powerful built-in flashes ever made. The 800si added a lot more features over its predecessor the 700si, at the expense of the 700si's card system, which most consumers at this time considered of little use due to the widespread integration of features into camera bodies. The 700si's vertical control grip, the VC-700, can also fit the 800si.

=== Fifth generation ===
==== 9 ====
The Dynax/Maxxum/α-9, Minolta's last professional film body, was released in 1998 and started the 5th and final generation of their 35 mm autofocus camera line. The camera is constructed with a zinc and aluminium cast frame covered by SUS304 stainless steel panels, uncommon for cameras, and can tolerate large amounts of abuse at the expense of some added weight. A vertical control grip (VC-9) mirroring the cameras basic controls was available. The camera had a maximum shutter speed capability of 1/12000 second due to carbon-fiber reinforced shutter blades, and a maximum frame rate of 5.5 frames/second. The camera just preceded the release of the SSM (SuperSonic Motor) lenses and D distance encoded lens/flash system, and as a result an upgrade was available in order to support the SSM lenses and D function. This upgrade was in the form of a complete systems board, unlike digital cameras which are usually upgradeable by software. Like all autofocusing Minolta SLR cameras it used the Minolta 'A-series' bayonet lens mounting system.

The 9 was the first Minolta to use a radically different user layout, with many buttons, instead of the "computerized" interfaces tried earlier especially in the i and xi series. The more classic interface was first "tested" in a si series camera, the 600si Classic (which in essence was a 700si with a different interface) and garnered positive response. This interface was then refined and proved to be a major hit with consumers and reviewers alike, was largely copied over to the Konica Minolta Maxxum 7D, and also kept in later advanced amateur/professional Sony digital cameras. The vertical control grip was also the first to feature a slightly lowered handgrip and shutter button, for better ergonomy in vertical shooting. This style of grip has also been featured in later Minolta and Sony models.

Also a titanium version of this camera was available as the 9Ti. The 9Ti had the same features as its regular counterpart with the exception of the silver finish and lighter weight of the titanium shell, a "wet type" rubber grip, knobs with relief labels in orange color instead of the standard model's knobs with phosphorescent paint, and a brown leather shoulder strap. It also received four additional custom functions for a total of 25. A lighter magnesium vertical grip VC-9M was available as well. The camera came out in 1999 in limited quantities only and with 4-digit serial numbers. It was sold out in 2001 already. A small batch of Dynax 9Ti bodies with 8-digit serial numbers in the #199011xx range and lacking the accessories surfaced in Germany between 2002 and 2006 (presumably assembled by Minolta's European Service Center in Bremen from 9Ti spare parts), dubbed the Dynax 9Ti II to distinguish it from the original 4-digit limited series of the 9Ti.

In the second and third hardware revision of the 9, including all SSM/ADI upgraded units, a special procedure (requiring no tools) can be utilized to reconfigure the camera to behave like the 9Ti and subsequently invoke the limited model's extra functions also in the black model.

==== 7 ====
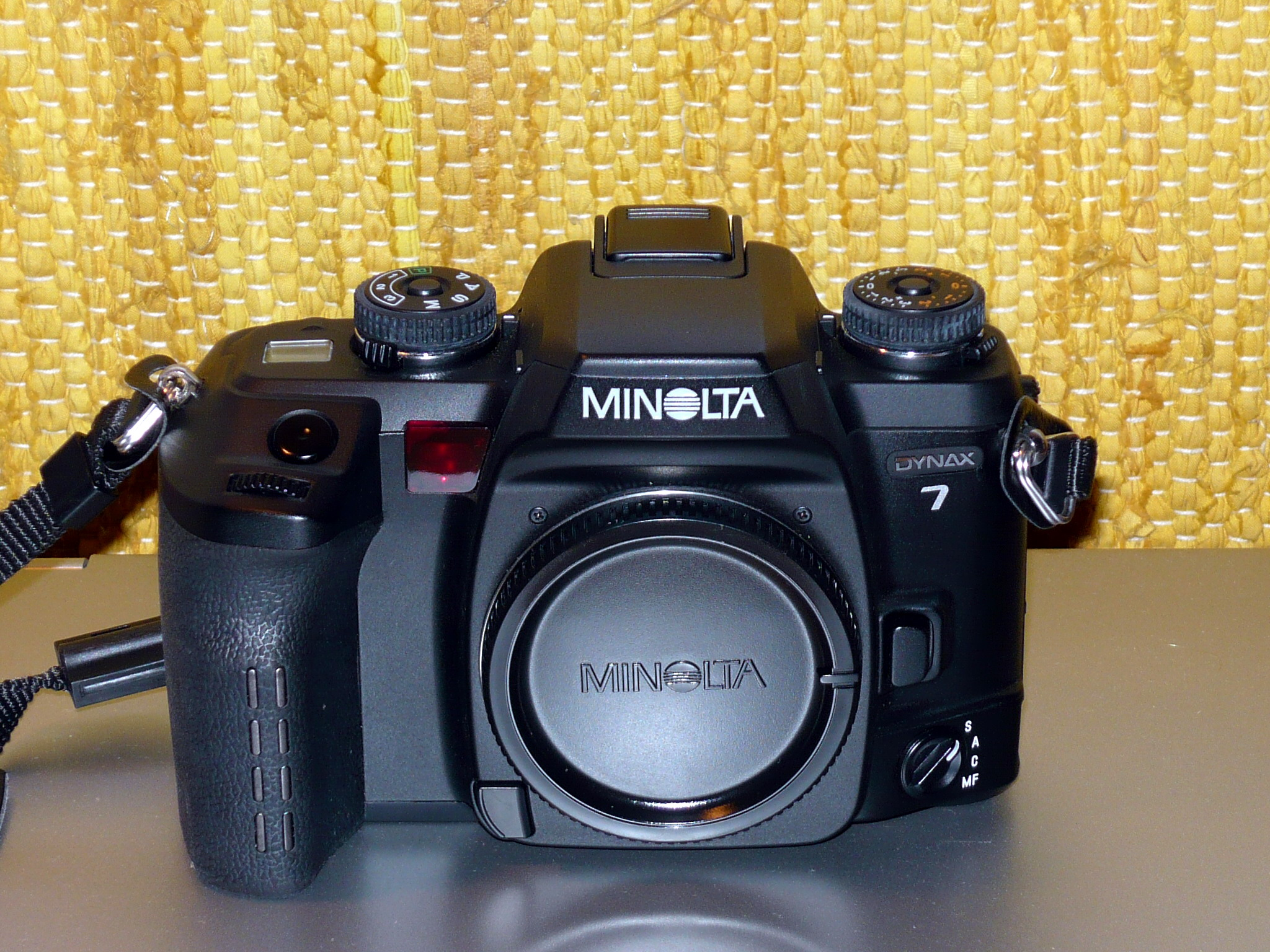
Dynax 7

The 7 is generally considered even more advanced in many respects than the Dynax/Maxxum/α-9, making it the most advanced Dynax/Maxxum/α. Amongst its many unusual features, it had an STF function which could emulate the Smooth Trans Focus effect by doing multiple exposures while varying the aperture — something done neither before nor since. The 7 was the first camera to support SSM lenses. Perhaps most noteworthy and radical was a huge LCD navigation display on the rear of the camera's film door. This offered a full operational view without the need of constant referral to the operating manual. It also eased operation of the 35 custom functions to change camera settings. Also, the 7 featured a plethora of dials and buttons as opposed to the "hold button while turning wheel" interface many of its other contemporaries offered. This interface was a direct evolution from the 9 and 600si Classic and later continued in other pro- and semi-pro models.

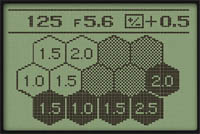
Rear LCD showing the current settings and exposure values measured before taking a picture

The 7 had a maximum shutter speed of 1/8000, a maximum frame rate of 4 frames/second, autofocus control with a 16-bit CPU coupled with a 14-segment honeycomb-pattern metering and the support of Minolta's ADI (Advanced Distance Integration) with its "D" series lenses. The camera also had a vertical control grip (VC-7) that replicated some basic controls for vertical shooting and extending shooting time with extra batteries. It included a film chamber lock to avoid accidental exposure of film that is still loaded.

In some markets a limited edition of the camera became available in 2001 as Dynax 7 Limited and α-7 Limited (there was no Maxxum variant of this model). It featured a larger internal film data memory, a slightly more refined finish of the exterior and golden-colored labels. Like the 9Ti it had 4-digit serial numbers, except for the Chinese α-7 Limited II model, which had 8-digit serial numbers. Also featuring a larger internal memory, there was a variant of the normal α-7 named α-7 CNM (Chinese navigation model) specifically for the Chinese market.

==== 5 ====
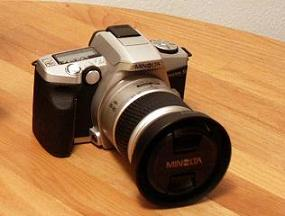
Maxxum 5 with 28-80 mm lens

The 5 was an easy-to-use, compact, and feature-packed film camera using core technologies from the Minolta Dynax/Maxxum/α-7. The Dynax/Maxxum/α-5 incorporated advanced autofocus (AF) technology, powerful film drive, relatively fast shutter speeds, and several creative features including 14 custom functions, into a small and light silver-colored SLR camera body. Like all other autofocus Minolta cameras, it used the same lenses initially offered in the mid-1980s. Also available was a battery grip (BP-200) for extended 35 mm film shooting.

The Maxxum 3 and Maxxum 4 are based on this Minolta, being less feature-rich entry-level cameras. This fifth generation (Dynax/Maxxum/α-3/4/5, 7 & 9) were the last full generation of film cameras that Minolta made with only two more film cameras (Dynax 60, Maxxum/α-70 and Dynax 30/40, Maxxum/α-50) produced before merging with Konica and leaving the 35 mm camera business all together.

=== Sixth generation ===
==== 40/50 ====
First of two sixth generation Minolta film cameras marketed as the Dynax 40 in Europe and the Maxxum 50 in the USA. Entry level camera which took the crown as lightest and smallest AF 35 mm SLR.

==== 60/70 ====
The last Minolta film camera, marketed as the Dynax 60 in Europe and the Maxxum 70 in the US. Essentially a Maxxum 5 with relatively minor changes (notably the addition of a PASM dial).

== Lenses ==
List of Minolta A-mount lenses:

Minolta A-mount lenses (Note: All lenses are designed cover the 35mm format with the exception of the "DT" lenses (11–18, 18–70 and 18–200), which cover APS-C.)
FL (mm)	Ap	Name	MPN	Lens ID	Mount	Filter	Distance encoder (Note: Lenses with a "distance encoder" provide subject distance information for utilization in the Advanced Distance Integration (ADI) flash mode and other features. While the "(D)" designation is used on the box and in the documentation, the lenses just feature a "D" instead. Requires 8 lens contacts; lenses with only 5 contacts cannot support this feature.)	AF-D support	Aberration correction	Release date	Comments
Prime lenses
Fisheye lenses
16	f/2.8	Minolta AF Fish-Eye 16mm f/2.8 (original revision)	2578-100, 2578-600	25781	5-pin	Built-in (NORMAL, O56, FLW, B12)	No	No	No	1986	Fisheye lens; first 600 units used a different barrel construction internally; optically similar to the Minolta MC Fish-Eye Rokkor 16mm f/2.8 (a.k.a. Leica Fisheye-Elmarit-R 16mm f/2.8) produced up to 1981 with an optical design originally introduced in 1966/1968.
16	f/2.8	Minolta AF Fish-Eye 16mm f/2.8 (later revision)	2578-110, 2578-610	25781	5-pin	Built-in (NORMAL, O56, A12, B12)	No	No	No	?	Fisheye lens; same design as before except for different built-in filters; succeeded by Sony SAL-16F28
Wide-angle lenses
20	f/2.8	Minolta AF 20mm f/2.8	2579-100, 2579-600, 2579-610	25791	5-pin	72mm	No	No	No	1986	
20	f/2.8	Minolta AF 20mm f/2.8 New	2641-110	25791	5-pin	72mm	No	No	Camera	1993	Restyled design; succeeded by Sony SAL-20F28
24	f/2.8	Minolta AF 24mm f/2.8	2566-100, 2566-110, 2566-600, 2566-610	25661	5-pin	55mm	No	No	No	1985-01	
24	f/2.8	Minolta AF 24mm f/2.8 New	2642-110	25661	5-pin	55mm	No	No	No	1994	Restyled design
28	f/2	Minolta AF 28mm f/2	2596-100, 2596-600, 2596-610	25961	5-pin	55mm	No	No	No	1986	
28	f/2	Minolta AF 28mm f/2 New	2668-118	25961	5-pin	55mm	No	No	No	1999	Restyled design
28	f/2.8	Minolta AF 28mm f/2.8	2557-100, 2557-600	25571	5-pin	49mm	No	No	Camera	1985-01	Succeeded by Sony SAL-28F28
35	f/1.4	Minolta AF 35mm f/1.4	2591-100, 2591-110, 2591-600, 2591-610	25911	5-pin	55mm	No	No	No	1987	
35	f/1.4	Minolta AF 35mm f/1.4 G New	2666-118	19	5-pin	55mm	No	No	No	1998	Succeeded by Sony SAL-35F14G
35	f/1.4	Konica Minolta AF 35mm f/1.4 G (D)	?	43	8-pin	55mm	Yes	Camera (since 2013-02-05)	Camera	N/A (2005-07)	Prototype only; revised optics; succeeded by Sony SAL-35F14G
35	f/2	Minolta AF 35mm f/2	2597-100, 2597-110, 2597-600, 2597-610	25971	5-pin	55mm	No	No	No	1987	
35	f/2	Minolta AF 35mm f/2 New	2667-118	25971	5-pin	55mm	No	No	No	1999	Restyled design
Normal lenses
50	f/1.4	Minolta AF 50mm f/1.4	2562-100, 2562-600	25621	5-pin	49mm	No	No	No	1985-01	Also available as calibrated version in conjunction with Minolta CS-1000A spectroradiometer
50	f/1.4	Minolta AF 50mm f/1.4 New	2662-110	25621	5-pin	55mm	No	No	No	1998	Restyled design; succeeded by Sony SAL-50F14
50	f/1.7	Minolta AF 50mm f/1.7	2550-100, 2550-600	25501	5-pin	49mm	No	No	No	1985-01	Original revision had metal focusing helicoid internally, while later revision was made of plastics
50	f/1.7	Minolta AF 50mm f/1.7 New	2613-100, 2613-600	26131	5-pin	49mm	No	No	No	1990	Restyled design; revised optics
50	f/2.8	Minolta AF Macro 50mm f/2.8	2564-100, 2564-600	25641	5-pin	55mm	No	No	No	1985-01	1:1 max.
50	f/2.8	Minolta AF Macro 50mm f/2.8 New	2638-100	25641?	5-pin	55mm	No	No	No	1993	1:1 max.; restyled design; also available as calibrated version in conjunction with Minolta CS-1000A spectroradiometer
50	f/2.8	Minolta AF Macro 50mm f/2.8 (D)	2675-100	31	8-pin	55mm	Yes	Camera (since 2013-02-05)	Camera	2001	1:1 max.; succeeded by Sony SAL-50M28
50	f/3.5	Minolta AF Macro 50mm f/3.5	2646-100	9	5-pin	55mm	No	No	No	1995	1:2 max.
Short telephoto lenses
85	f/1.4	Minolta AF 85mm f/1.4	2592-100, 2592-600, 2592-610	25921?	5-pin	72mm	No	No	No	1987	
85	f/1.4	Minolta AF 85mm f/1.4 G	2629-118	25921? or 27?	5-pin	72mm	No	No	No	1993	Restyled design
85	f/1.4	Minolta AF 85mm f/1.4 G (D)	2677-118	27	8-pin	72mm	Yes	No	No	2000	Restyled design
85	f/1.4	Minolta AF 85mm f/1.4 G (D) Limited	2689-118	35	8-pin	72mm	Yes	No	No	2002-05 (2002-03)	Restyled design; revised optics; distributed in Japan only (700 units)
100	f/2	Minolta AF 100mm f/2	2598-100, 2598-110, 2598-600, 2598-610	25981	5-pin	55mm	No	No	No	1987	
100	f/2.8	Minolta AF Macro 100mm f/2.8	2581-100, 2581-600, 2581-610	25811	5-pin	55mm	No	No	No	1986	1:1 max.
100	f/2.8	Minolta AF Macro 100mm f/2.8 New	2639-110	25811?	5-pin	55mm	No	No	No	1993	1:1 max.; restyled design
100	f/2.8	Minolta AF Macro 100mm f/2.8 (D)	2676-110	28	8-pin	55mm	Yes	Camera (since 2013-02-05)	Camera	2000	1:1 max.; succeeded by Sony SAL-100M28
100	f/2.8	Minolta AF Soft Focus 100mm f/2.8	2648-118	12	5-pin	55mm	No	No	No	1994	Soft Focus lens
135	f/2.8	Minolta AF 135mm f/2.8	2556-100, 2556-600	25561	5-pin	55mm	No	No	No	1985-01	
135	f/2.8	Minolta STF 135mm f/2.8 [T4.5]	2656-118	20	5-pin	72mm	No	No	No	1999	Smooth Trans Focus; manual focus; aperture ring; succeeded by Sony SAL-135F28
Telephoto lenses
200	f/2.8	Minolta AF Apo Tele 200mm f/2.8 G (Note: Design includes apochromatic lens element(s))	2593-100, 2593-600, 2593-610	25931	5-pin	72mm	No	No	No	1986	Without "High Speed" gearing and sticker and without focus-stop button; white finish
200	f/2.8	Minolta AF Apo Tele 200mm f/2.8 G (High Speed upgrade)	Custom upgrade by Minolta service (based on 2593)	26121?	5-pin	72mm	No	No	No	1988?	With High Speed gearing, but without "High Speed" sticker and without focus-stop button; white finish
200	f/2.8	Minolta High Speed AF Apo Tele 200mm f/2.8 G New	2612-110, 2612-610	26121	5-pin	72mm	No	No	No	1988?, 1989-03	With "High Speed" label and focus-stop button; white finish
200	f/4	Minolta AF Apo Tele Macro 200mm f/4 G	2658-118	23	5-pin	72mm	No	No	No	1999	1:1 max.; also available as calibrated version in conjunction with Minolta CS-1000T spectroradiometer
300	f/2.8	Minolta AF Apo Tele 300mm f/2.8 G (original revision)	2563-626	25631	5-pin	114mm (front) / 42mm (slot-in)	No	No	No	1985-01	7-digit serial number; no CLR front filter; tripod knob to the right; without "High Speed" gearing and sticker and without focus-stop buttons; optically based on an SR-mount Minolta MD Apo Tele Rokkor 300mm f/2.8 prototype; white finish
300	f/2.8	Minolta AF Apo Tele 300mm f/2.8 G (later revision)	2563-100, 2563-636	25631	5-pin	114mm (front) / 42mm (slot-in)	No	No	No	1986	8-digit serial number; with CLR front filter; tripod knob to the left; without "High Speed" gearing and sticker and without focus-stop buttons; white finish
300	f/2.8	Minolta AF Apo Tele 300mm f/2.8 G (High Speed upgrade)	Custom upgrade by Minolta service (based on 2563)	26081?	5-pin	114mm (front) / 42mm (slot-in)	No	No	No	1988?	8-digit serial number; with CLR front filter; tripod knob to the left; with "High Speed" gearing, but without "High Speed" sticker and without focus-stop buttons; white finish
300	f/2.8	Minolta High Speed AF Apo Tele 300mm f/2.8 G New	2608-136, 2608-636	26081	5-pin	114mm (front) / 42mm (slot-in)	No	No	No	1988?, 1989-03	8-digit serial number; with CLR front filter; tripod knob to the left; with "High Speed" label and focus-stop buttons; white finish
300	f/2.8	Minolta AF Apo Tele 300mm f/2.8 G (D) SSM	2674-118	32	8-pin	None (front) / 42mm (slot-in)	Yes	Camera (since 2013-02-05)	No	2003 (2002-03)	White finish; succeeded by Sony SAL-300F28G
300	f/4	Minolta High Speed AF Apo Tele 300mm f/4 G	2640-128	11	5-pin	82mm (front) / 42mm (slot-in)	No	No	No	1994	White finish
400	f/4.5	Minolta High Speed AF Apo Tele 400mm f/4.5 G	2651-116	15	5-pin	95mm (front) / 42mm (slot-in)	No	No	No	1995	White finish
500	f/8	Minolta AF Reflex 500mm f/8	2572-118, 2572-618	25721	5-pin	82mm (front) / 28mm (slot-in) / 42mm (slot-in)	No	No	No	1989-03	Catadioptric lens; succeeded by Sony SAL-500F80
600	f/4	Minolta AF Apo Tele 600mm f/4 G	2565-100, 2565-626, 2565-636	25651	5-pin	154.5mm (front) / 42mm (slot-in)	No	No	No	1985-08	Without "High Speed" gearing and label and without focus-stop buttons; white finish
600	f/4	Minolta AF Apo Tele 600mm f/4 G (High Speed upgrade)	Custom upgrade by Minolta service (based on 2565)	26091?	5-pin	154.5mm (front) / 42mm (slot-in)	No	No	No	1988?	With "High Speed" gearing, but without "High Speed" label and without focus-stop buttons; white finish
600	f/4	Minolta High Speed AF Apo Tele 600mm f/4 G New	2609-136, 2609-636	26091	5-pin	154.5mm (front) / 42mm (slot-in)	No	No	No	1988?, 1989-03	With "High Speed" label and with focus-stop buttons; white finish
Zoom lenses
Wide-angle and special purpose zoom lenses
3×–1×	f/1.7–2.8	Minolta AF Macro Zoom 3×-1× f/1.7-2.8	2594-116, 2594-616	25941	5-pin	46mm	No	No	No	1990	3:1 max.; white finish; also available as calibrated version in conjunction with Minolta CS-1000S spectroradiometer
11–18	f/4.5–5.6	Konica Minolta AF Zoom DT 11-18mm f/4.5-5.6 (D) (Note: DT is "Digital Technology", lenses for cameras with APS-C (or Super-35mm) size sensors, only. DT lenses will not fully illuminate the sensor/film area of 24×36mm full-frame cameras. Three DT lenses were made and sold by Konica Minolta: 11–18, 18–70, and 18–200mm.)	2698-110	41	8-pin	77mm	Yes	No	No	2005	Derivation of Tamron SP AF 11-18mm f/4.5-5.6 Di II LD Aspherical [IF] (model A13M) design; succeeded by Sony SAL-1118
17–35	f/2.8–4	Konica Minolta AF Zoom 17-35mm f/2.8-4 (D)	2695-110	38	8-pin	77mm	Yes	No	No	2004	Derivation of Tamron SP AF 17-35mm f/2.8-4 Di LD Aspherical [IF] (model A05M) design; black finish
17–35	f/3.5	Minolta AF Zoom 17-35mm f/3.5 G	2654-118	16	5-pin	77mm	No	No	No	1997	Black finish
20–35	f/3.5–4.5	Minolta AF Zoom 20-35mm f/3.5-4.5	2657-118	17	5-pin	72mm	No	No	No	1998	
Wide to normal/tele zoom lenses
18–70	f/3.5–5.6	Konica Minolta AF Zoom DT 18-70mm f/3.5-5.6 (D)	2697-810	40	8-pin	55mm	Yes	No	No	2005	Succeeded by Sony SAL-1870
18–200	f/3.5–6.3	Konica Minolta AF Zoom DT 18-200mm f/3.5-6.3 (D)	2699-110	42	8-pin	62mm	Yes	No	No	2005	Derivation of Tamron AF 18-200mm f/3.5-6.3 XR Di II LD Aspherical [IF] (model A14M) design; succeeded by Sony SAL-18200
24–50	f/4	Minolta AF Zoom 24-50mm f/4	2558-100, 2558-110, 2558-600, 2558-610	25581	5-pin	55mm	No	No	No	1987	Black finish
24–50	f/4	Minolta AF Zoom 24-50mm f/4 New	2632-110	26321?	5-pin	55mm	No	No	No	1992	Restyled design
24–85	f/3.5–4.5	Minolta AF Zoom 24-85mm f/3.5-4.5	2636-110	6?	5-pin	62mm	No	No	No	1993	Also available as limited red-brown Urushi-lacquered Minolta AF Zoom 24-85mm f/3.5-4.5 Japan variant
24–85	f/3.5–4.5	Minolta AF Zoom 24-85mm f/3.5-4.5 New	2660-110	6	5-pin	62mm	No	No	No	1997	Restyled design
24–105	f/3.5–4.5	Minolta AF Zoom 24-105mm f/3.5-4.5 (D)	2672-110	24	8-pin	62mm	Yes	No	No	2000	Succeeded by Sony SAL-24105
28–70	f/2.8	Minolta AF Zoom 28-70mm f/2.8 G	2620-118	2	5-pin	72mm	No	No	No	1993	Black finish
28–70	f/2.8	Minolta AF Zoom 28-70mm f/2.8 G (D) SSM	2686-118	34?	8-pin	77mm	Yes	Yes	No	N/A (2002–03)	Prototype only, announced on 2002-03-19 and publicly shown up to 2004, but never released; black finish
28–75	f/2.8	Konica Minolta AF Zoom 28-75mm f/2.8 (D)	2696-810	39	8-pin	67mm	Yes	No	No	2004	Derivation of Tamron SP AF 28-75mm f/2.8 XR Di LD Aspherical [IF] Macro (model A09M) design; black finish; succeeded by Sony SAL-2875
28–80	f/3.5–5.6	Minolta AF Zoom 28-80mm f/3.5-5.6	2659-100, 2659-110	4? or 18?	5-pin	?	No	No	No	?	
28–80	f/3.5–5.6	Minolta AF Zoom 28-80mm f/3.5-5.6 II	2670-110, 2670-150, 2670-160	18	5-pin	62mm	No	No	No	1987	Restyled design
28–80	f/3.5–5.6	Minolta AF Zoom 28-80mm f/3.5-5.6 (D)	2683-900, 2683-910, 2683-950, 2683-960	30	8-pin	55mm	Yes	No	No	2001	Restyled design; black or silver finish
28–80	f/4–5.6	Minolta AF Zoom xi 28-80mm f/4-5.6	2618-110	26181	8-pin	55mm	No	No	No	1991	Black finish
28–80	f/4–5.6	Minolta AF Macro Zoom 28-80mm f/4-5.6 New	2633-100, 2633-110	3	5-pin	55mm	No	No	No	1993	Black finish
28–85	f/3.5–4.5	Minolta AF Macro Zoom 28-85mm f/3.5-4.5	2552-100, 2552-600, 2552-610	25521	5-pin	55mm	No	No	No	1985-01	
28–85	f/3.5–4.5	Minolta AF Macro Zoom 28-85mm f/3.5-4.5 New	2586-110, 2586-610	0	5-pin	55mm	No	No	No	1992	Restyled design
28–100	f/3.5–5.6	Minolta AF Zoom 28-100mm f/3.5-5.6 (D)	2692-810, 2692-860	36	8-pin	55mm	Yes	No	No	2003	Black or silver finish
28–105	f/3.5–4.5	Minolta AF Zoom xi 28-105mm f/3.5-4.5	2615-110	26151?	8-pin	62mm	No	No	No	1991	Black finish
28–105	f/3.5–4.5	Minolta AF Zoom 28-105mm f/3.5-4.5	2635-110	10	5-pin	62mm	No	No	No	1994	Restyled design
28–105	f/3.5–4.5	Minolta AF Zoom 28-105mm f/3.5-4.5 New	2661-110	10?	5-pin	62mm	No	No	No	1997	Restyled design
28–135	f/4–4.5	Minolta AF Macro Zoom 28-135mm f/4-4.5	2553-100, 2553-600	25531	5-pin	72mm	No	No	No	1985-01	Black finish
35–70	f/3.5–4.5	Minolta AF Zoom 35-70mm f/3.5-4.5	2643-100	5?	5-pin	49mm	No	No	No	1993	Black finish; has focusing scale window
35–70	f/3.5–4.5	Minolta AF Zoom 35-70mm f/3.5-4.5 II? / New?	2652-100	5?	5-pin	49mm	No	No	No	?	Black finish; has no focusing scale
35–70	f/4	Minolta AF Macro Zoom 35-70mm f/4	2551-100, 2551-600, 2551-610	25511	5-pin	49mm	No	No	No	1985-01	Black finish
35–80	f/4–5.6	Minolta AF Zoom 35-80mm f/4-5.6	2605-100, 2605-110, 2605-600	26071	5-pin	46mm	No	No	No	1988-10	
35–80	f/4–5.6	Minolta AF Power Zoom 35-80mm f/4-5.6	2624-110	26241	8-pin	49mm	No	No	No	1991	Restyled design; black finish
35–80	f/4–5.6	Minolta AF Zoom 35-80mm f/4-5.6 II	2671-110, 2671-160	22	5-pin	49mm	No	No	No	1999	Restyled design
35–105	f/3.5–4.5	Minolta AF Macro Zoom 35-105mm f/3.5-4.5	2554-100, 2554-600, 2554-610	25541	5-pin	55mm	No	No	No	1985-01	
35–105	f/3.5–4.5	Minolta AF Zoom 35-105mm f/3.5-4.5 New	2585-100, 2585-600, 2585-610	25858	5-pin	55mm	No	No	No	1988-10	Restyled design; white finish version available as Minolta AF Zoom 35-105mm f/3.5-4.5 Prestige (2585-110?)
35–200	f/4.5–5.6	Minolta AF Zoom xi 35-200mm f/4.5-5.6	2616-110, 2616-610	26161?	8-pin	62mm	No	No	No	1991	Black finish
Telephoto zoom lenses
70–200	f/2.8	Minolta AF Apo Tele Zoom 70-200mm f/2.8 G (D) SSM	2682-118	33	8-pin	77mm	Yes	No	No	2003 (2002-03)	White finish; succeeded by Sony SAL-70200G
70–210	f/3.5–4.5	Minolta AF Zoom 70-210mm f/3.5-4.5	2588-100, 2588-600, 2588-610, (2588-810)	25881?	5-pin	55mm	No	No	No	1988-10	
70–210	f/4	Minolta AF Zoom 70-210mm f/4	2555-100, 2555-110, 2555-600, 2555-610	25551	5-pin	55mm	No	No	No	1985-01	Optically based on the Minolta MD Zoom 70-210mm f/4 (a.k.a. Leica Vario-Elmar-R 70-210mm f/4); black finish, also available as "dealer demo" in transparent housing
70–210	f/4.5–5.6	Minolta AF Zoom 70-210mm f/4.5-5.6 (New?)	2634-110	8	5-pin	49mm	No	No	No	1993	
70–210	f/4.5–5.6	Minolta AF Zoom 70-210mm f/4.5-5.6 II	2669-110, 2669-160	8?	5-pin	49mm	No	No	No	1999	
75–300	f/4.5–5.6	Minolta AF Zoom 75-300mm f/4.5-5.6	2561-100, 2561-110, 2561-600, 2561-610	25611	5-pin	55mm	No	No	No	1985-08	Black finish
75–300	f/4.5–5.6	Minolta AF Zoom 75-300mm f/4.5-5.6 New	2649-110	13?	5-pin	55mm	No	No	No	1996	Black finish
75–300	f/4.5–5.6	Minolta AF Zoom 75-300mm f/4.5-5.6 II	2665-110, 2665-160	13?	5-pin	55mm	No	No	No	1999	Black or silver finish
75–300	f/4.5–5.6	Minolta AF Zoom 75-300mm f/4.5-5.6 (D)	2684-910, 2684-960	29	8-pin	55mm	Yes	No	No	2001	Black or silver finish; succeeded by Sony SAL-75300
80–200	f/2.8	Minolta AF Apo Tele Zoom 80-200mm f/2.8 G	2589-100, 2589-600, 2589-610	25891	5-pin	72mm	No	No	No	1987	Black finish
80–200	f/2.8	Minolta High Speed AF Apo Tele Zoom 80-200mm f/2.8 G (New?)	2628-118	1	5-pin	72mm	No	No	No	1993	White finish
80–200	f/4.5–5.6	Minolta AF Zoom 80-200mm f/4.5-5.6	2604-100, 2604-600	26041?	5-pin	46mm	No	No	No	1988-10	Black finish
80–200	f/4.5–5.6	Minolta AF Zoom xi 80-200mm f/4.5-5.6	2619-110, 2619-610	26191?	8-pin	55mm	No	No	No	1991	Black finish
100–200	f/4.5	Minolta AF Zoom 100-200mm f/4.5	2560-100, 2560-600, 2560-610, 2560-611	25601	5-pin	49mm	No	No	No	1986	Black finish
100–300	f/4.5–5.6	Minolta AF Zoom 100-300mm f/4.5-5.6	2606-100, 2606-110, 2606-600, 2606-610	26061?	5-pin	55mm	No	No	No	1988-10	Black finish
100–300	f/4.5–5.6	Minolta AF Zoom xi 100-300mm f/4.5-5.6	2621-110	26211?	8-pin	55mm	No	No	No	1991	Black finish
100–300	f/4.5–5.6	Minolta AF Apo Tele Zoom 100-300mm f/4.5-5.6	2631-?	7	5-pin	55mm	No	No	No	1993?	Black finish; smooth rubber focus ring
100–300	f/4.5–5.6	Minolta AF Apo Tele Zoom 100-300mm f/4.5-5.6 New	2631-110?	7?	5-pin	55mm	No	No	No	1995?	Black finish; ribbed focus ring
100–300	f/4.5–5.6	Minolta AF Apo Tele Zoom 100-300mm f/4.5-5.6 (D)	2681-110	25	8-pin	55mm	Yes	No	No	2000	Black finish
100–400	f/4.5–6.7	Minolta AF Apo Tele Zoom 100-400mm f/4.5-6.7	2644-110	14	5-pin	72mm	No	No	No	1995	Black finish
Teleconverters
1.4×	1.4×	Minolta AF 1.4× Tele Converter Apo	2590-100, 2590-600, 2590-607	25901	5-pin	N/A	No	No	No	1986	Not recommended for lenses with "High Speed" gearing; white finish
1.4×	1.4×	Minolta AF 1.4× Tele Converter Apo-II	2610-107, 2610-607	Lens ID of mounted lens or 65535 (no lens)	5-pin	N/A	No	No	?	1988?, 1989-03	White finish
1.4×	1.4×	Minolta AF 1.4× Tele Converter Apo (D)	2687-107	Lens ID of mounted lens or 65535 (no lens)	8-pin	N/A	Yes	No	?	2003 (2002-03)	Recommended for SSM/ADI; white finish; succeeded by Sony SAL-14TC
2×	2×	Minolta AF 2× Tele Converter Apo	2601-100, 2601-600, 2601-607	26011	5-pin	N/A	No	No	No	1987	Not recommended for lenses with "High Speed" gearing; white finish
2×	2×	Minolta AF 2× Tele Converter Apo-II	2611-107, 2611-607	Lens ID of mounted lens or 65535 (no lens)	5-pin	N/A	No	No	?	1988?, 1989-03	White finish
2×	2×	Minolta AF 2× Tele Converter Apo (D)	2688-107	Lens ID of mounted lens or 65535 (no lens)	8-pin	N/A	Yes	No	?	2003 (2002-03)	Recommended for SSM/ADI; white finish; succeeded by Sony SAL-20TC
2×	2×	Minolta AF 2× M/A Converter-S	2583-107	65535 (no chip)	0-pin	N/A	No	No	No	1985-08	For use of SR-mount lenses shorter than 300mm on A-mount bodies; black finish; optically identical to Minolta MD 2× Tele Converter 300-S
2×	2×	Minolta AF 2× M/A Converter-L	2584-107, (2583-207)	65535 (no chip)	0-pin	N/A	No	No	No	1985-08	For use of SR-mount lenses longer than 300mm on A-mount bodies; black finish; optically identical to Minolta MD 2× Tele Converter 300-L
Special purpose lenses
50	f/1.7	Minolta AF Master Lens 50mm f/1.7	2072-0006-75	25501?	5-pin	49mm	No	No	No	1985	Specially calibrated lens with fixed focus and fixed aperture for camera service; optics based on Minolta AF 50mm f/1.7 (2550-100, 2550-600); cannot be used for normal photography; black finish

Notes

Notes and nomenclature
Apo	Apochromatic lens element(s)
(D) or D	"Distance encoder", lens provides subject distance information for utilization in the Advanced Distance Integration (ADI) flash mode and other features. While the "(D)" designation is used on the box and in the documentation, the lenses just feature a "D" instead. Requires 8 lens contacts; lenses with only 5 contacts cannot support this feature.
DT	"Digital Technology", lenses for cameras with APS-C (or Super-35mm) size sensors, only. DT lenses will not fully illuminate the sensor/film area of 24×36mm full-frame cameras. Three DT lenses were made and sold by Konica Minolta: 11–18, 18–70, and 18–200mm.
G	"Gold" series, Minolta's line-up of high-grade lenses. The "G" status does not occur as label on the lenses, but is indicated by a decorating ring on the lens.
High Speed	High Speed upgraded gearing for faster autofocus. As indicated, three lenses were upgradeable in authorized service centers as well.
II	Version II. Some lenses underwent more than just cosmetic changes, and are referred to as second version, in particular, when the optics have changed completely.
New	Restyled (not a designation found on the lens), aesthetic changes (such lenses were labelled "New" or "Neu" or "(N)" on the box and in the documentation by Minolta, but not specifically labelled on the lens itself).
SSM	"SuperSonic Motor", silent in-lens ultrasonic motor used on some lenses. Requires 8 lens contacts; lenses with only 5 contacts cannot support this feature. Can be used with manual focusing on cameras without SSM support (that is, Minolta film bodies released before 2000 - Minolta Dynax/Maxxum/α-9/9Ti can be upgraded by service).
Power or xi	Motorized zoom. Requires 8 lens contacts; lenses with only 5 contacts cannot support this feature.

=== Third-party lenses ===
- Sigma
- Tamron

== See also ==
- Background to the Minolta autofocus SLR range
- List of Minolta A-mount cameras
- Minolta V-mount
- Minolta SR-mount
- Sony E-mount
- List of Sony A-mount lenses
