= Minolta SR-mount =

Camera mounting system

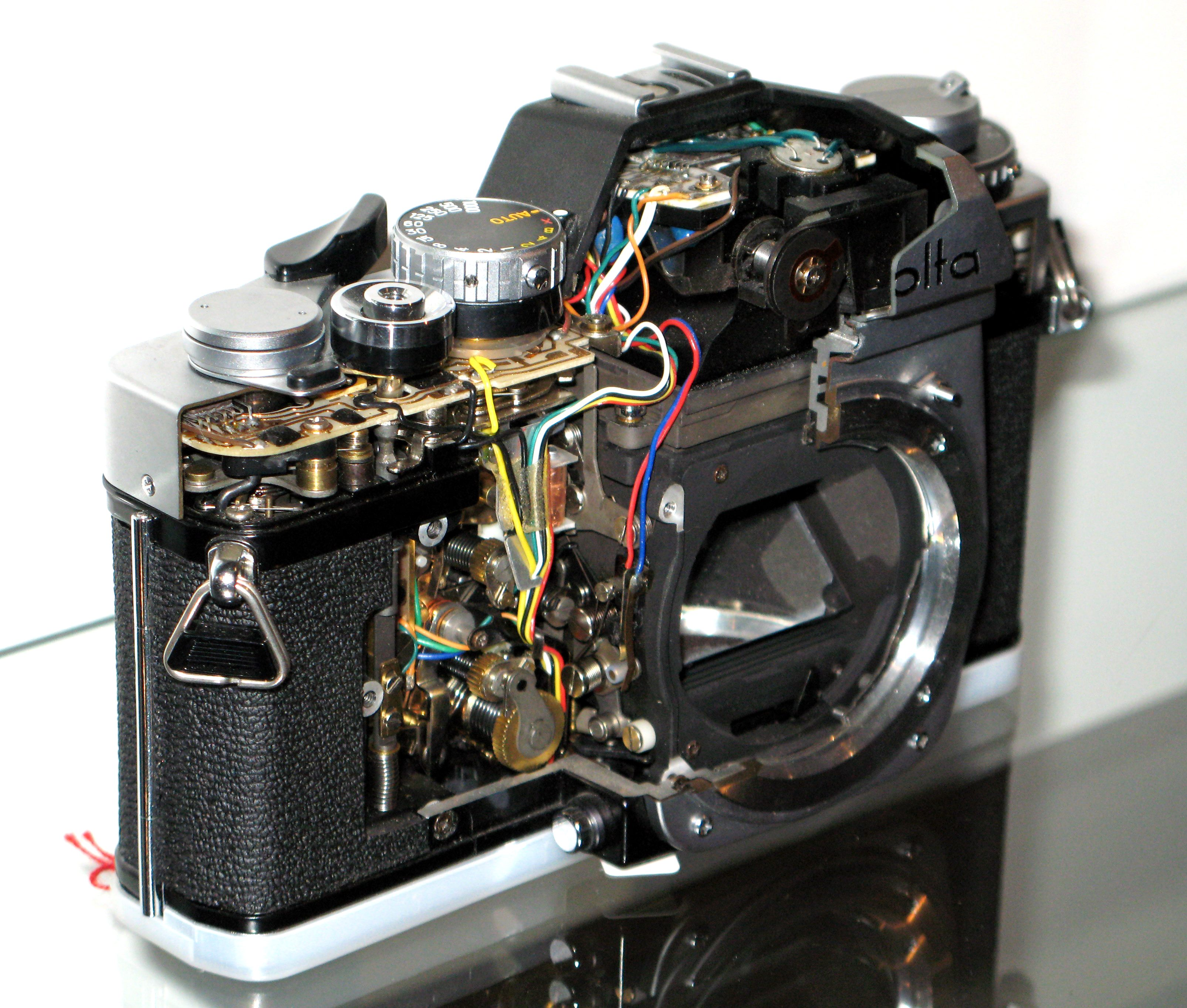
- A cut-away Minolta XE showing its mount
- Type: Bayonet
- Tabs: 3
- Flange: 43.5 mm
- Connectors: automatic diaphragm

The Minolta SR-mount was the bayonet mounting system used in all 35 mm SLR cameras made by Minolta with interchangeable manual focusing lenses. Several iterations of the mounting were produced over the decades, and as a result, the mount itself was sometimes referred to by the name of the corresponding lens generation (f.e. "MC", "MD" or "X-600") instead.

== Design ==
=== Compatibility ===
All lenses for these mounts are interchangeable between older and newer Minolta manual focus 35 mm film SLR bodies. There are exceptions, such as, the lenses before 1961 feature a slightly different aperture leverage, and thus the automatic diaphragm may not work correctly on post-1961 cameras, and later MC/MD tabs may hit a screw of the front cover on earlier cameras. Four design enhancements, all forwardly inclusive and backwardly compatible, are:

1. SR - 1958-1966: Plain SR-bayonet featuring automatic diaphragm. Lenses are labelled Rokkor (pre-set) or Auto Rokkor (automatic diaphragm)
2. MC - 1966-1977: Meter coupling added (often called MC mount) allowing full-aperture TTL measurement. Lenses are labelled MC Rokkor.
3. MD - 1977-2001: MD lever added, which allows the reading of the smallest available aperture, often referred to as MD mount. Lenses are labelled MD Rokkor or MD.
4. MD X-600 - 1983-1998: X-600 mount extension reporting the maximum aperture of the lens to the camera body, which then engaged different auto focus confirmation sensors in the camera body.

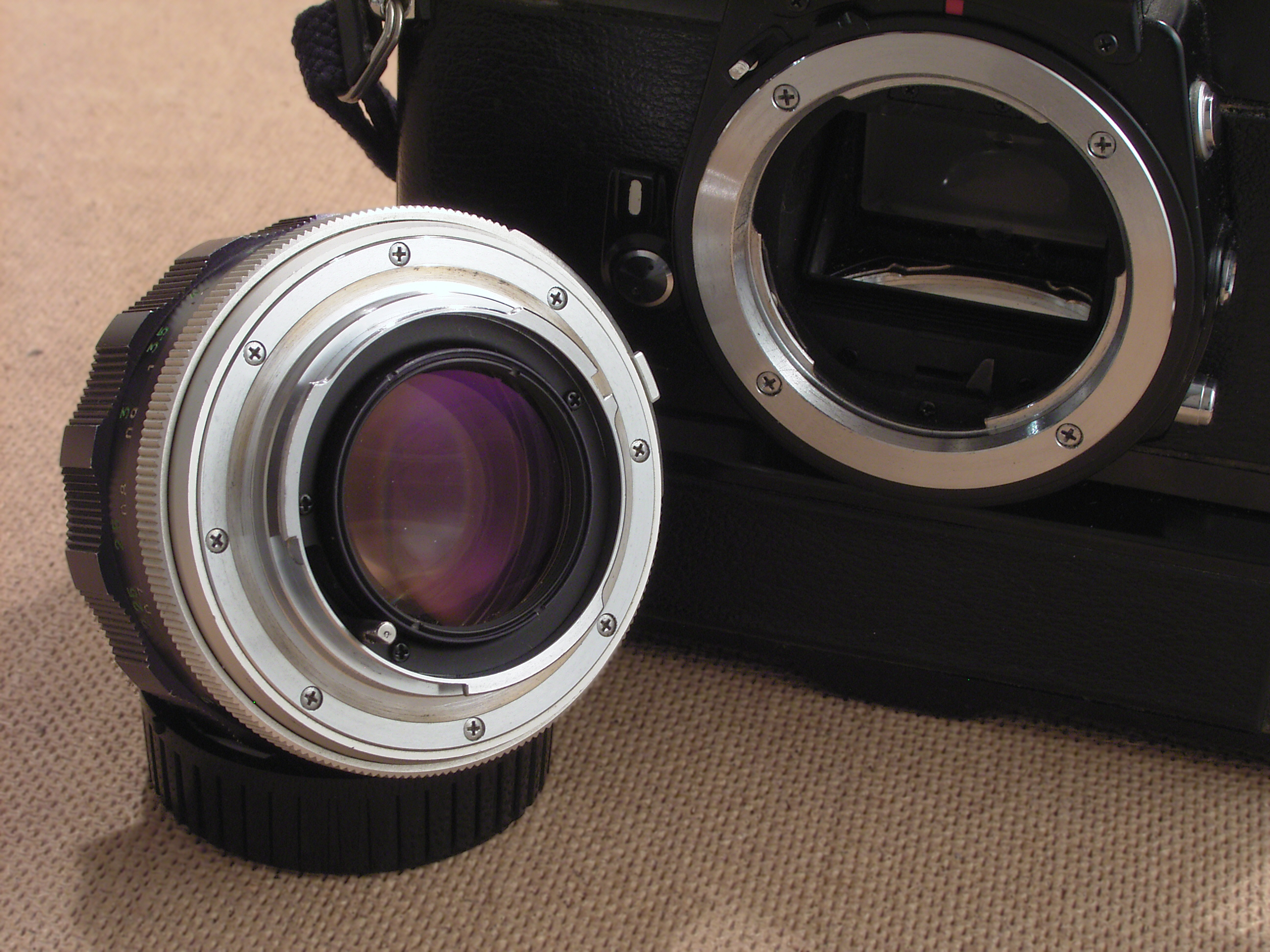
Rokkor-PF 1:1.4/58mm with "MC" mount and XD-7 body with "MD" mount

=== History ===
SR - The SR camera models from 1958 to 1967 features the initial design implementation of the SR bayonet, beginning with the Minolta SR-2. These are mechanical cameras without TTL metering or automatic exposure. The 1962 Minolta SR-7 was the first 35 mm SLR with a built-in CdS meter, providing the same metering capabilities as the external clip-on meter available for the 1960 Minolta SR-3 and later models of the Minolta SR-1.

MC - The SR-T 101 launched in 1966 has a lens coupling for full aperture through-the-lens (TTL) metering. A coupling lug protruding from the aperture ring operates the follower needle in the viewfinder, allowing the lens aperture to be set according to the meter reading. The camera has two CdS cells attached to the top of the prism that reads in a center-weighted fashion the brightness off the focusing screen. The later X-1 and XE models, also using the MC lenses, has an aperture-priority automatic exposure mode.

Aperture ring with MD-tab, and lock

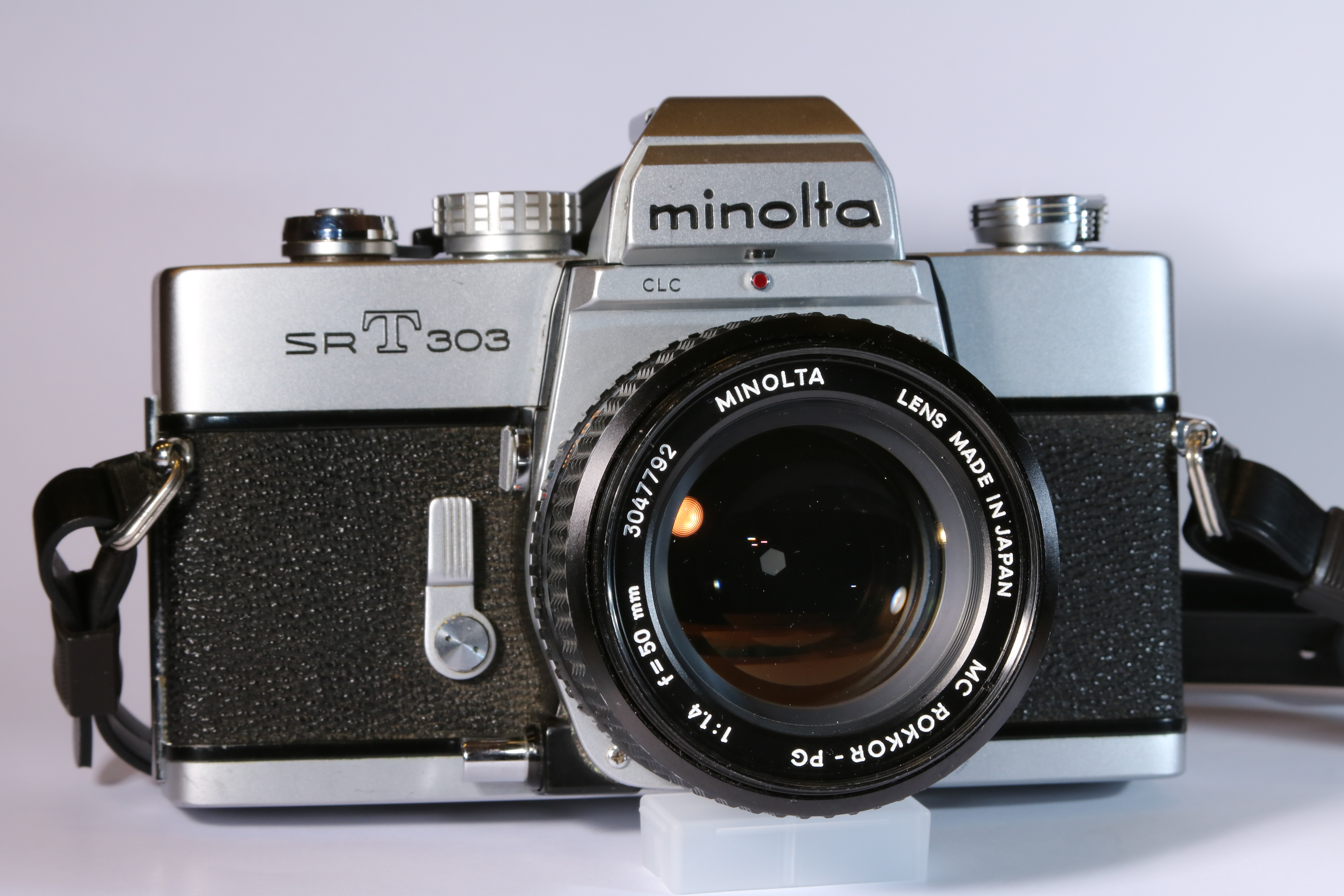
Minolta SR-T 303 camera with MC Rokkor-PG 50 mm 1:1.4 lens.

MD - In 1977, the XD series introduced an additional tab on the lens which reported the smallest available aperture (f/16, f/22, or f/32) to the camera to accomplish shutter priority automatic exposure in S mode on the Minolta XD-7 (XD-11 in the U.S.A.), and later in the P (programmed automatic exposure) mode on the X-700. The proper use of this feature meant that the lenses had to be set to their smallest aperture. In 1981, MD lenses included a minimum aperture lock that prevented the aperture ring from accidentally being moved.

X-600 - On the 1983 Minolta X-600 camera, intended for the Japanese market, there is also a focus assist and confirmation feature. The Minolta X-600 sensors need the lens's maximum aperture so that the camera body can use its appropriate sensors for judging focus accuracy. There is a tab inside the lens that identifies either

- f/2.8 or larger maximum lens aperture, or
- f/3.5 or smaller maximum aperture.

The lens tab operates a switch inside the body of the X-600. There is no MD Auto Exposure feature on the X-600.

The SR-bayonet mount was replaced by the Minolta A-mount, which was introduced in 1985.

== Adapters ==
A variety of glass-less adapters allow SR mount lenses to be used on modern 4/3, Leica M-mount, Micro 4/3, Sony E-mount, Fujifilm FX-mount, Canon RF lens mount and Nikon Z-mount digital cameras, albeit without any aperture control from the camera body. Instead the lens is stopped down as the aperture ring is turned (allowing depth of field preview), rather than when the shutter button is pressed.

There are also adapters for Minolta/Sony A-mount cameras, but they either do not maintain infinity focus or contain glass-elements, working as 1.2-2× tele-converter, changing the optical properties of the system and often deteriorating the image-quality.

== See also ==
- List of Minolta SR-mount cameras
- List of Minolta SR-mount lenses
- Minolta V-mount
- Minolta A-mount
- Sony A-mount
- Sony E-mount
