= 75–300mm lens =

75–300mm is a common focal length for camera lenses. Multiple articles exist about such lenses:

- Canon EF 75–300mm lens
- Minolta AF 75-300mm f/4.5-5.6 lens
