= List of Minolta A-mount lenses =

Minolta and its successor Konica Minolta released the following lenses for Minolta A-mount cameras between 1985 and 2006.

== History ==
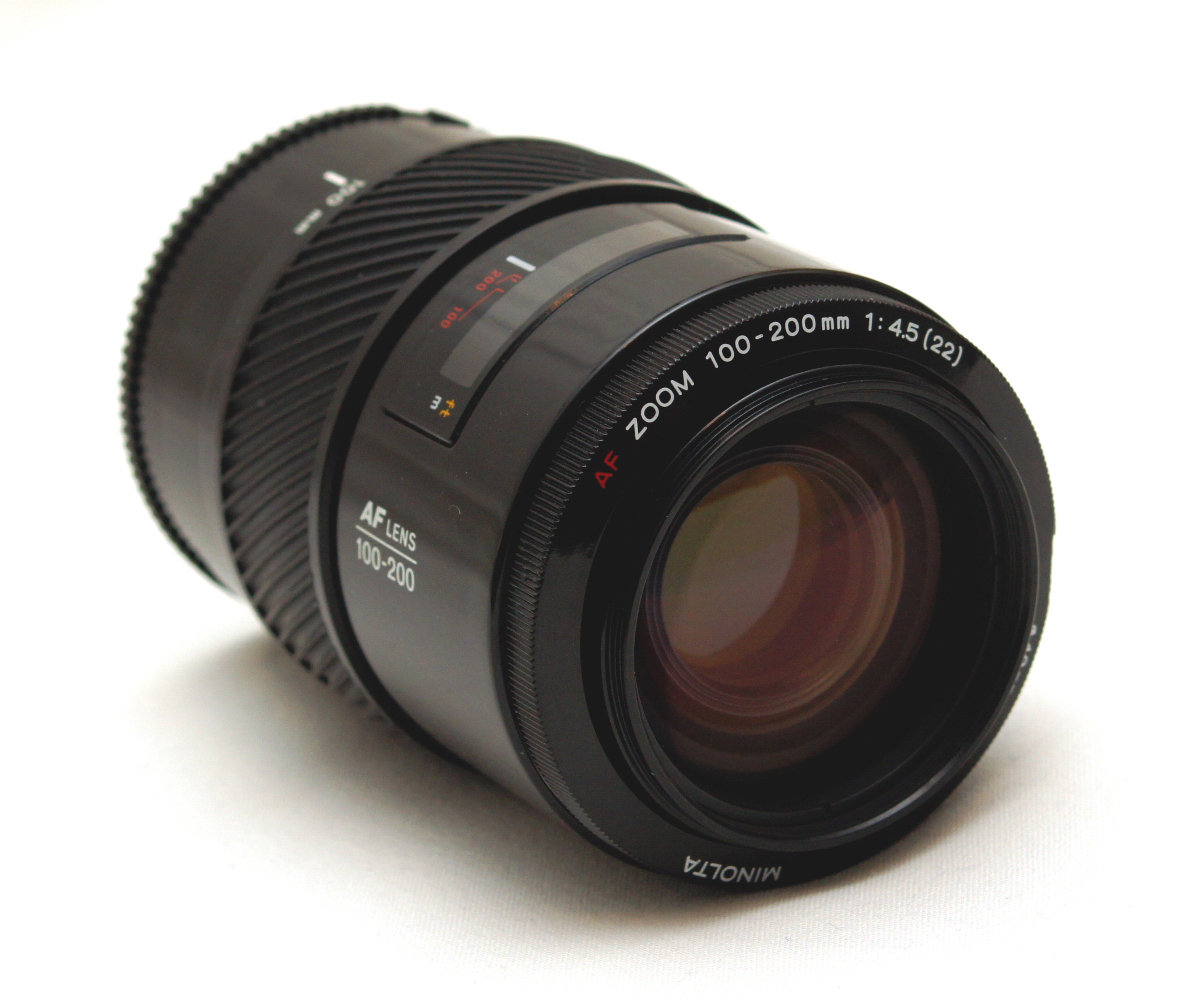
Minolta AF 100–200 mm f/4.5, typical of original lens styling, with narrow straight-ribbed focusing ring at front, distance window, diagonal rubber-ribbed zoom ring

While most auto-focus lens designs were new developments, some optical constructions were derived from Minolta SR-mount lenses. In the United States, the Maxxum system launched in 1985 with twelve lenses:

- 24mm f/2.8
- 28mm f/2.8
- 50mm f/1.4
- 50mm f/1.7
- 50mm f/2.8 Macro
- 135mm f/2.8
- 300mm f/2.8 APO
- 28–85mm f/3.5–4.5
- 28–135mm f/4–4.5
- 35–70mm f/4
- 35–105mm f/3.5–4.5
- 70–210mm f/4

When the second camera, the 9000, was launched later in 1985, two more lenses were added: the 75–300 mm f/4.5–5.6 and 600 mm f/4 APO. By 1986, Minolta had expanded the lineup by releasing 16 mm f/2.8 fisheye, 20 mm f/2.8, 28 mm f/2, 100 mm f/2.8 Macro, 200 mm f/2.8, and 100–200 mm f/4.5 lenses.

=== Restyled ("i" series) ===
Restyled 35–105mm f/3.5–4.5

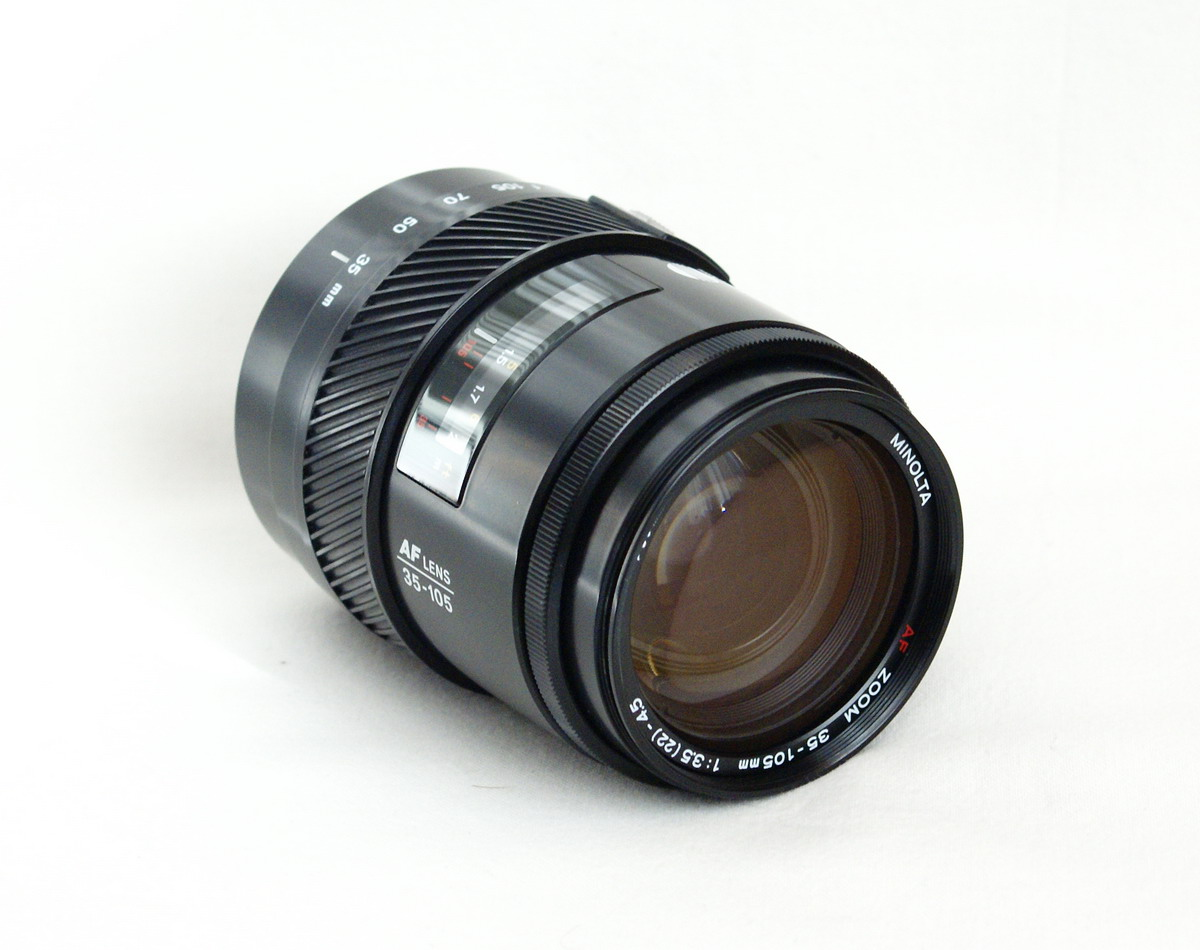
Original design

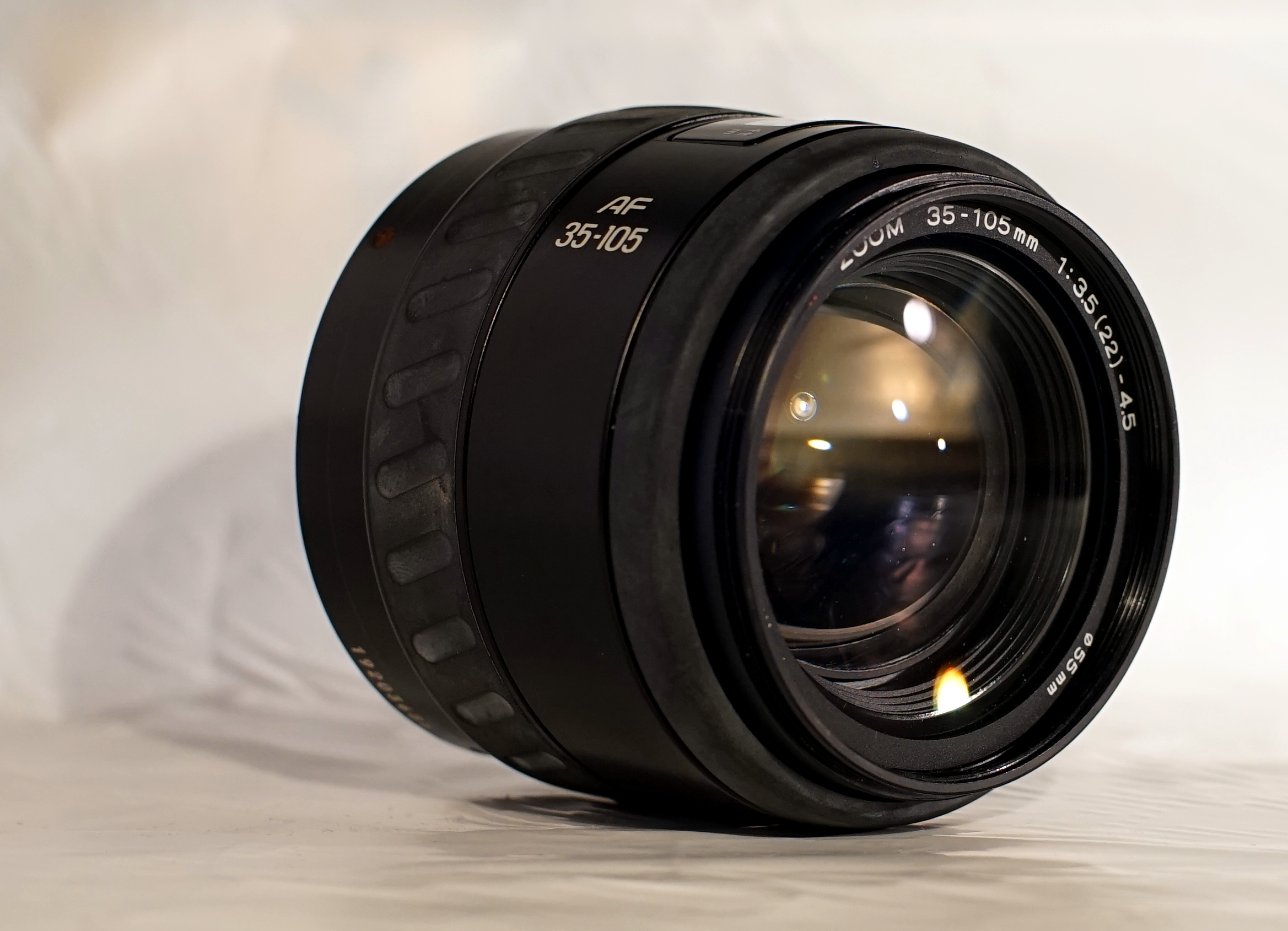
"New" or "Restyled", including optical design changes to make lens more compact

Initially, the lenses were equipped with narrow ribbed manual focus rings in hard plastic near the front; most lenses had a diagonally-ribbed rubber grip, which was used as the zoom ring on zoom lenses. Starting in 1988 with the release of the "i" series cameras, new lenses were released with an updated grip style featuring broader, rounded diagonal shapes and a rubber coated focus ring. These new lenses included 35–80 mm f/4–5.6 (with built-in lens cap), 80–200 mm f/4.5–5.6, 35–105 mm f/3.5–4.5, 70–210 mm f/3.5–4.5, and 100–300 mm f/4.5–5.6.

Some of the original lenses were updated and re-released with the same cosmetics and are known as "New" or "Restyled" versions; minor optical updates such as coatings and aperture shape were sometimes included. Lens labeling varies slightly; lenses with the original style are marked "AF Lens" on the side of the lens with the focal length(s), while restyled lenses are marked "AF" in a rounded typeface with focal length(s), but without "Lens".

=== 8-pin ("xi" series) and distance encoding ===
Electronic contact variations

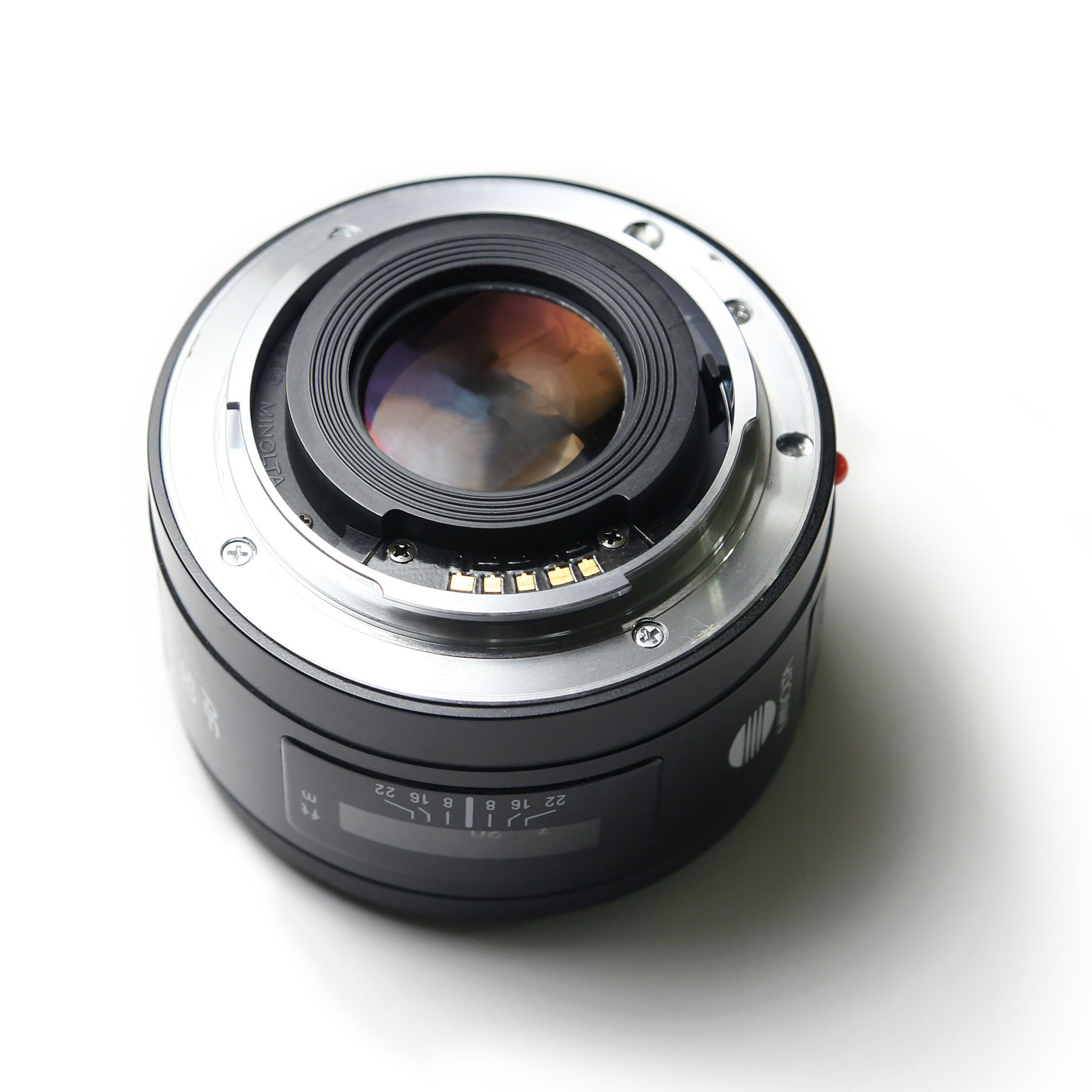
Initial 5-pin contact scheme (50mm f/1.7)

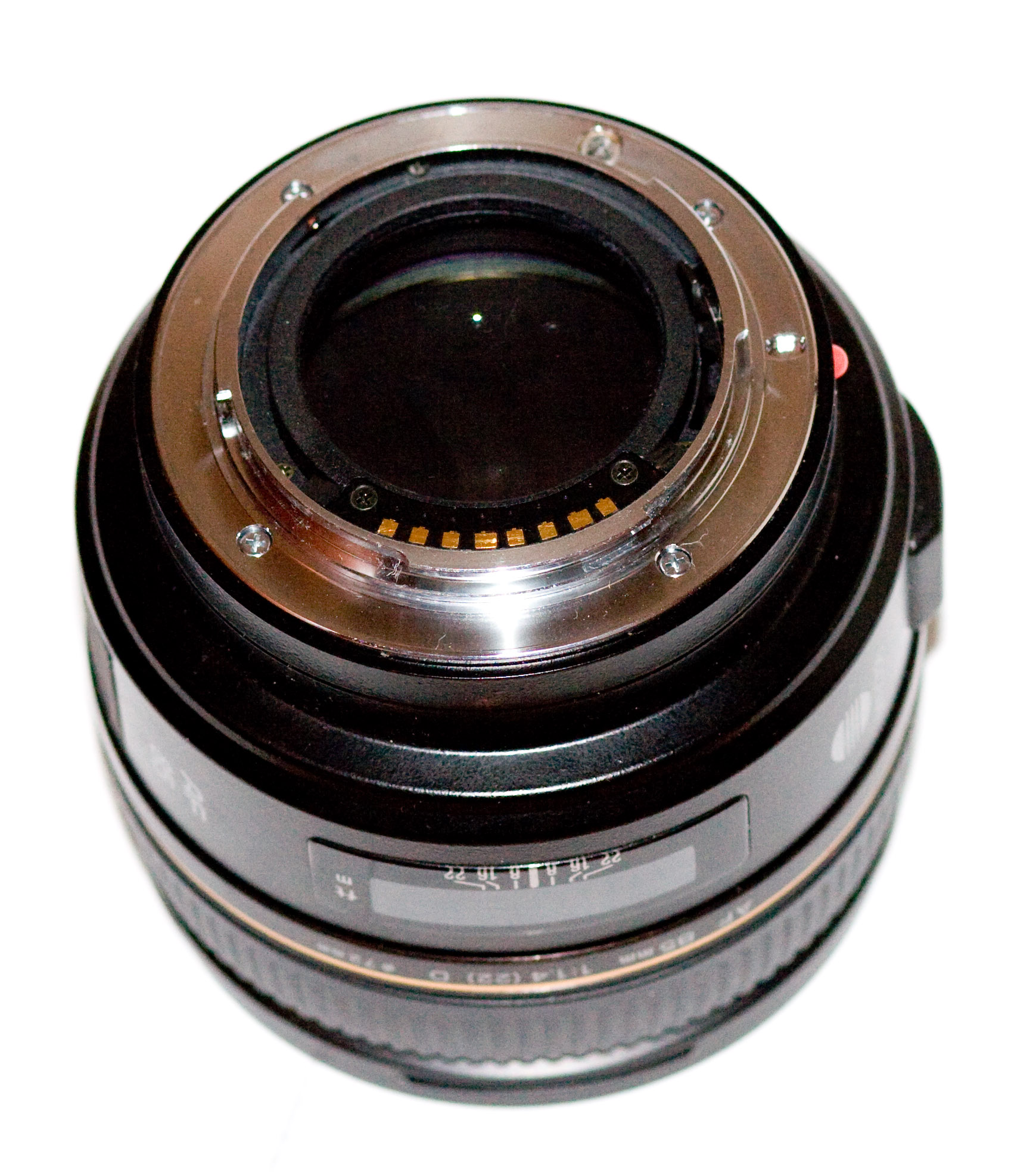
ADI-compatible 8-pin contact (85mm f/1.4 G)

When the "xi" series cameras were introduced with the 7xi in 1991, new and updated lenses were released with three additional contacts (eight total) to support an in-lens motor for body-controlled power zoom, which was used by the "fuzzy logic" system in that camera body. The power zoom function was touted to "automatically [provide] a suggested composition" in dealer marketing materials. Five lenses were released with power zoom features, which are equipped with a single control ring that combines both manual focusing and zoom functions, and are marked as "Zoom xi" lenses:

- 28–80mm f/4–5.6
- 28–105mm f/3.5–4.5
- 35–200mm f/4.5–5.6
- 80–200mm f/4.5–5.6
- 100–300mm f/4.5–5.6

Later, with the introduction of the Maxxum/Alpha 7 and its support for distance-encoded HS(D) flashes in 2001, Minolta began fitting all lenses with the three additional contacts, repurposed to support the Advance Distance Integration (ADI) functionality, which reports the focus distance back to the camera body.

=== Branding updates ===
Lenses were branded as "Konica Minolta" starting in August 2003 following the merger of the two companies.

When Sony took over the system in 2006, 12 lenses were rebranded as Sony A-mount lenses and launched alongside 6 new designs and 2 teleconverters. Of the dozen rebranded lenses, most are optically, mechanically and electrically identical to their Minolta predecessors and differ only in their outer appearance, however, three have seen subtle changes in the optics and electro-mechanics. The 20 lenses relaunched in 2006 included:

- 16mm f/2.8 (legacy)
- 20mm f/2.8 (legacy)
- 28mm f/2.8 (legacy)
- 35mm f/1.4 G (new)
- 50mm f/1.4 (legacy)
- 50mm f/2.8 Macro (legacy)
- 85mm f/1.4 Zeiss (new)
- 100mm f/2.8 Macro (legacy)
- 135mm f/1.8 Zeiss (new)
- 135mm f/2.8 STF (legacy)
- 300mm f/2.8 G (new)
- 500mm f/8 Reflex (legacy)
- 11–18mm f/4.5–5.6 (legacy)
- 16–80mm f/3.5–4.5 Zeiss (new)
- 18–70mm f/3.5–5.6 (legacy)
- 18–200mm f/3.5–6.3 (legacy)
- 70–200mm f/2.8 G (new)
- 75–300mm f/4.5–5.6 (legacy)
- 1.4× Teleconverter
- 2.0× Teleconverter

All Minolta and Konica Minolta A-mount lenses are compatible with Sony A-mount cameras.

=== Regional variations ===
Regional variations for Minolta 50mm f/1.7 lenses

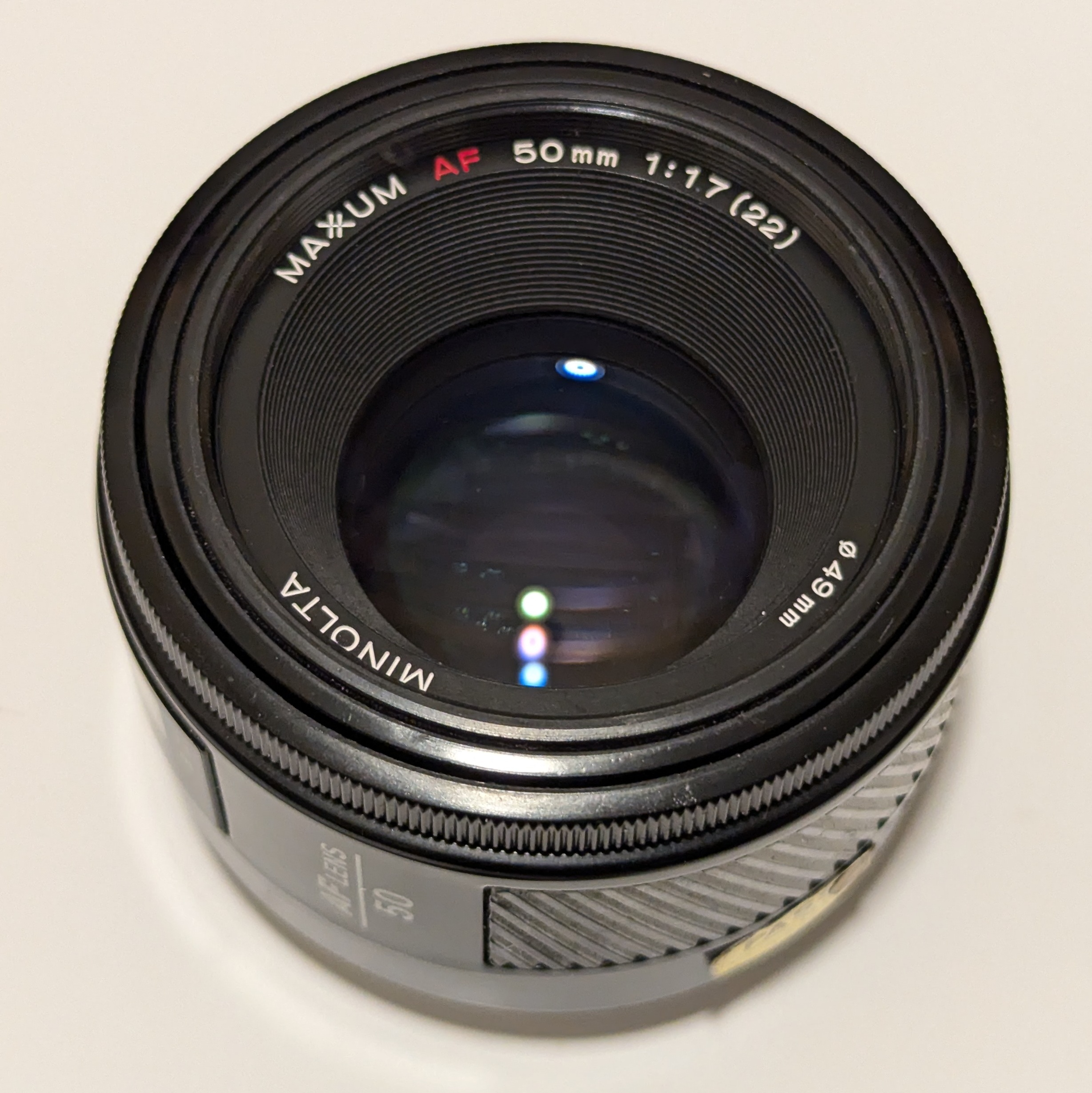
Early "crossed-X" Maxxum, which prompted a lawsuit from Exxon

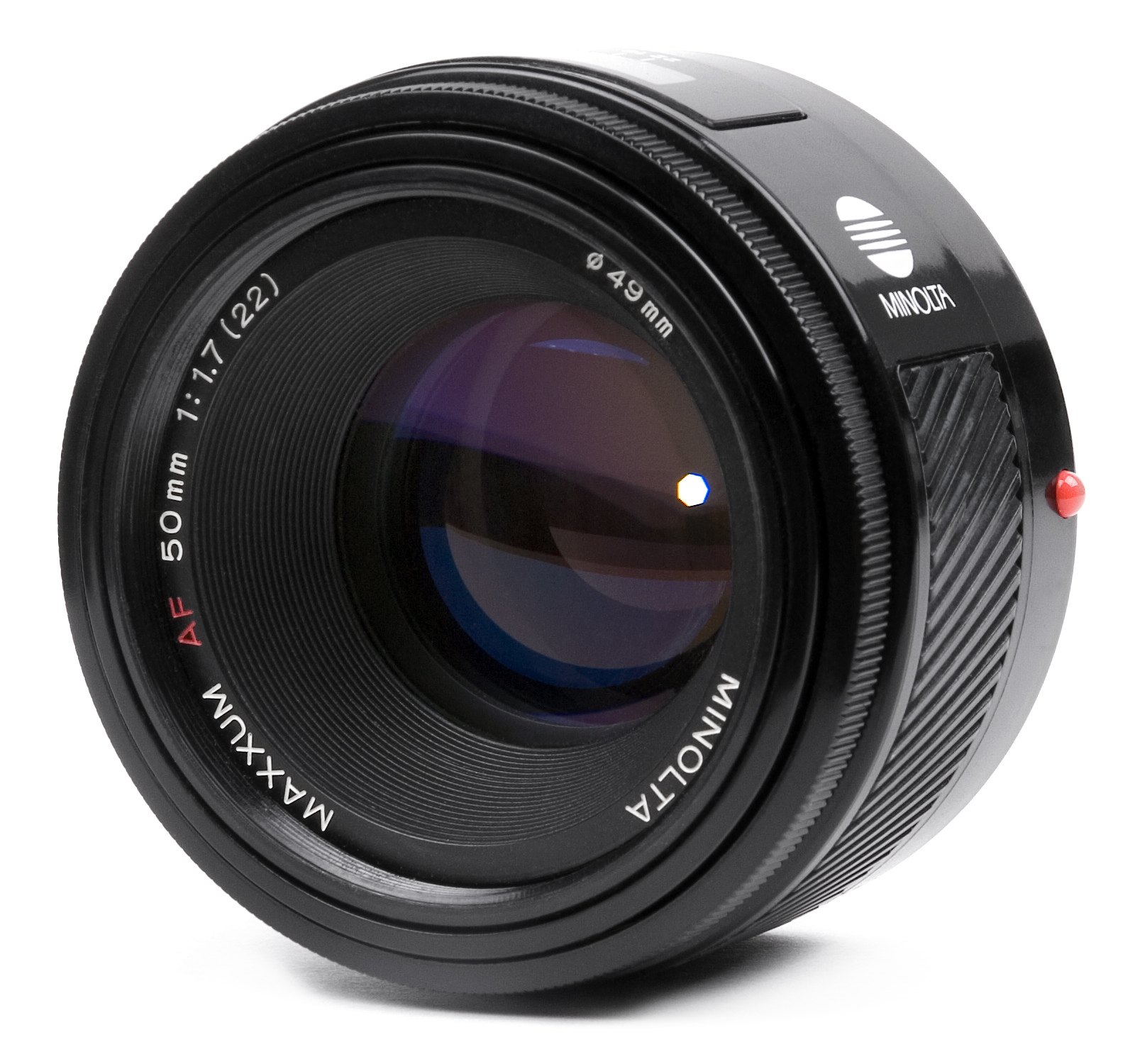
Branded as "Maxxum AF" for the North American market (original version with hard ribbed plastic focus ring)

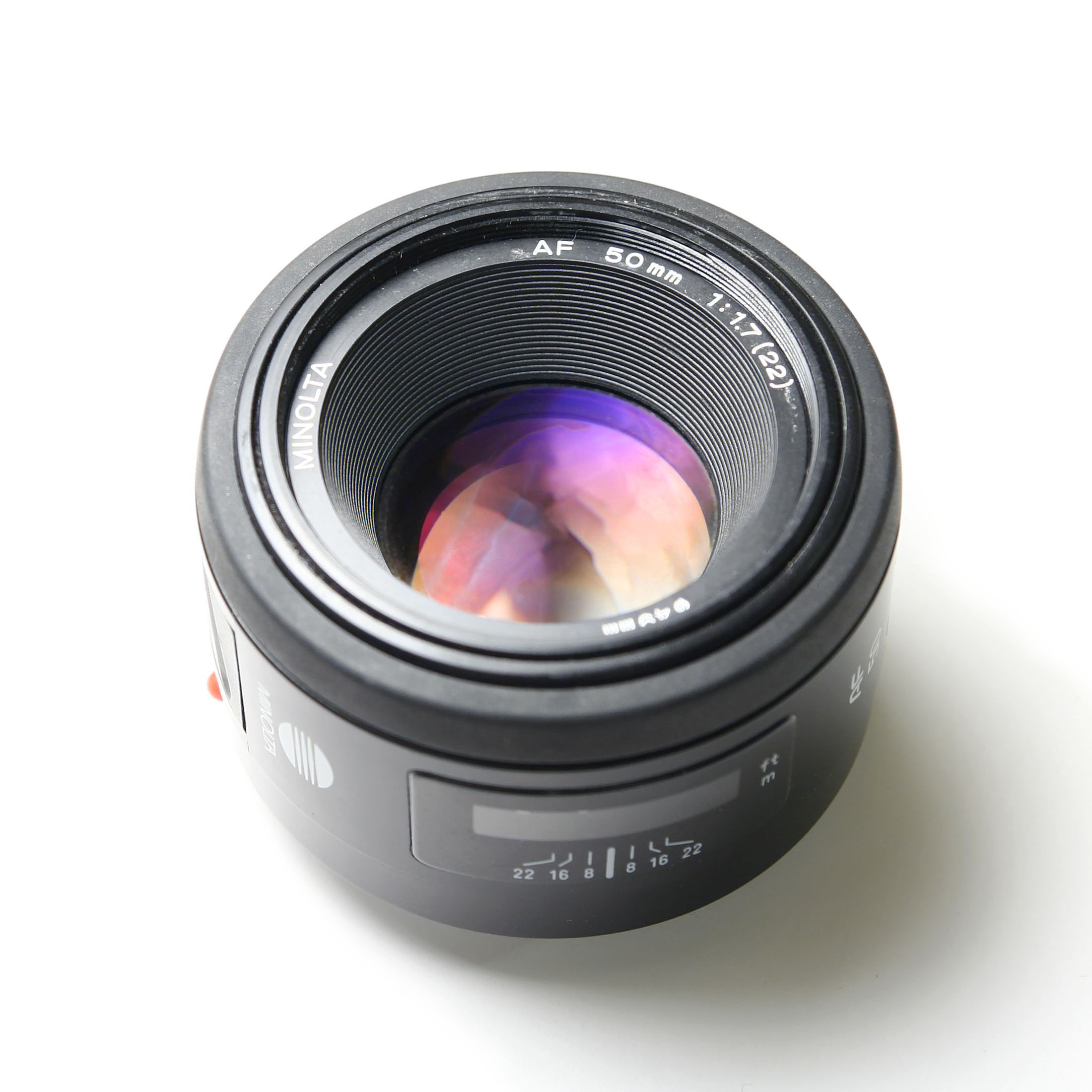
Branded as "AF" for the rest of the world ("New" version with rubber focus ring)

In North America, Minolta marketed the camera and lenses with the Maxxum branding. Until the mid 1990s, A-mount lenses for the North American market were engraved as Maxxum AF; the rest of the world were branded as AF lenses, including the regions using the Dynax and α branding for the cameras. The initial production runs of Maxxum AF lenses introduced with the camera system in 1985 originally used a "crossed XX" font, which was soon dropped by Minolta after Exxon brought a trademark lawsuit that year; under the settlement, Minolta agreed to change its logo.

Although some buyers associated either the Maxxum AF or the AF designation with a higher quality, both types of lenses were built to exactly the same specifications and quality standards in the factory, and were only used to improve trackability and distinguish gray market imports (lenses originally purchased from international sources and resold in North America by private importers rather than official imports from Minolta). They differed only in their cosmetics (name plate engraving) and part number designations (????-1?? for AF, ????-6?? for Maxxum AF). A similar scheme previously had been used by Minolta in the 1960s and 1970s to distinguish their Rokkor and Rokkor-X branding variants for SR-mount lenses.

== List of Minolta A-mount lenses ==
Minolta A-mount lenses (Note: All lenses are designed cover the 35mm format with the exception of the "DT" lenses (11–18, 18–70 and 18–200), which cover APS-C.)
| FL (mm) | Ap | Name | MPN | Lens ID | Mount | Filter | Distance encoder (Note: Lenses with a "distance encoder" provide subject distance information for utilization in the Advanced Distance Integration (ADI) flash mode and other features. While the "(D)" designation is used on the box and in the documentation, the lenses just feature a "D" instead. Requires 8 lens contacts; lenses with only 5 contacts cannot support this feature.) | AF-D support | Aberration correction | Release date | Comments |
|---|---|---|---|---|---|---|---|---|---|---|---|
Prime lenses
Fisheye lenses
| 16 | f/2.8 | Minolta AF Fish-Eye 16mm f/2.8 (original revision) | 2578-100, 2578-600 | 25781 | 5-pin | Built-in (NORMAL, O56, FLW, B12) | No | No | No | 1986 | Fisheye lens; first 600 units used a different barrel construction internally; optically similar to the Minolta MC Fish-Eye Rokkor 16mm f/2.8 (a.k.a. Leica Fisheye-Elmarit-R 16mm f/2.8) produced up to 1981 with an optical design originally introduced in 1966/1968. |
| 16 | f/2.8 | Minolta AF Fish-Eye 16mm f/2.8 (later revision) | 2578-110, 2578-610 | 25781 | 5-pin | Built-in (NORMAL, O56, A12, B12) | No | No | No | ? | Fisheye lens; same design as before except for different built-in filters; succeeded by Sony SAL-16F28 |
Wide-angle lenses
| 20 | f/2.8 | Minolta AF 20mm f/2.8 | 2579-100, 2579-600, 2579-610 | 25791 | 5-pin | 72mm | No | No | No | 1986 | |
| 20 | f/2.8 | Minolta AF 20mm f/2.8 New | 2641-110 | 25791 | 5-pin | 72mm | No | No | Camera | 1993 | Restyled design; succeeded by Sony SAL-20F28 |
| 24 | f/2.8 | Minolta AF 24mm f/2.8 | 2566-100, 2566-110, 2566-600, 2566-610 | 25661 | 5-pin | 55mm | No | No | No | 1985-01 | |
| 24 | f/2.8 | Minolta AF 24mm f/2.8 New | 2642-110 | 25661 | 5-pin | 55mm | No | No | No | 1994 | Restyled design |
| 28 | f/2 | Minolta AF 28mm f/2 | 2596-100, 2596-600, 2596-610 | 25961 | 5-pin | 55mm | No | No | No | 1986 | |
| 28 | f/2 | Minolta AF 28mm f/2 New | 2668-118 | 25961 | 5-pin | 55mm | No | No | No | 1999 | Restyled design |
| 28 | f/2.8 | Minolta AF 28mm f/2.8 | 2557-100, 2557-600 | 25571 | 5-pin | 49mm | No | No | Camera | 1985-01 | Succeeded by Sony SAL-28F28 |
| 35 | f/1.4 | Minolta AF 35mm f/1.4 | 2591-100, 2591-110, 2591-600, 2591-610 | 25911 | 5-pin | 55mm | No | No | No | 1987 | |
| 35 | f/1.4 | Minolta AF 35mm f/1.4 G New | 2666-118 | 19 | 5-pin | 55mm | No | No | No | 1998 | Succeeded by Sony SAL-35F14G |
| 35 | f/1.4 | Konica Minolta AF 35mm f/1.4 G (D) | ? | 43 | 8-pin | 55mm | Yes | Camera (since 2013-02-05) | Camera | N/A (2005-07) | Prototype only; revised optics; succeeded by Sony SAL-35F14G |
| 35 | f/2 | Minolta AF 35mm f/2 | 2597-100, 2597-110, 2597-600, 2597-610 | 25971 | 5-pin | 55mm | No | No | No | 1987 | |
| 35 | f/2 | Minolta AF 35mm f/2 New | 2667-118 | 25971 | 5-pin | 55mm | No | No | No | 1999 | Restyled design |
Normal lenses
| 50 | f/1.4 | Minolta AF 50mm f/1.4 | 2562-100, 2562-600 | 25621 | 5-pin | 49mm | No | No | No | 1985-01 | Also available as calibrated version in conjunction with Minolta CS-1000A spectroradiometer |
| 50 | f/1.4 | Minolta AF 50mm f/1.4 New | 2662-110 | 25621 | 5-pin | 55mm | No | No | No | 1998 | Restyled design; succeeded by Sony SAL-50F14 |
| 50 | f/1.7 | Minolta AF 50mm f/1.7 | 2550-100, 2550-600 | 25501 | 5-pin | 49mm | No | No | No | 1985-01 | Original revision had metal focusing helicoid internally, while later revision was made of plastics |
| 50 | f/1.7 | Minolta AF 50mm f/1.7 New | 2613-100, 2613-600 | 26131 | 5-pin | 49mm | No | No | No | 1990 | Restyled design; revised optics |
| 50 | f/2.8 | Minolta AF Macro 50mm f/2.8 | 2564-100, 2564-600 | 25641 | 5-pin | 55mm | No | No | No | 1985-01 | 1:1 max. |
| 50 | f/2.8 | Minolta AF Macro 50mm f/2.8 New | 2638-100 | 25641? | 5-pin | 55mm | No | No | No | 1993 | 1:1 max.; restyled design; also available as calibrated version in conjunction with Minolta CS-1000A spectroradiometer |
| 50 | f/2.8 | Minolta AF Macro 50mm f/2.8 (D) | 2675-100 | 31 | 8-pin | 55mm | Yes | Camera (since 2013-02-05) | Camera | 2001 | 1:1 max.; succeeded by Sony SAL-50M28 |
| 50 | f/3.5 | Minolta AF Macro 50mm f/3.5 | 2646-100 | 9 | 5-pin | 55mm | No | No | No | 1995 | 1:2 max. |
Short telephoto lenses
| 85 | f/1.4 | Minolta AF 85mm f/1.4 | 2592-100, 2592-600, 2592-610 | 25921? | 5-pin | 72mm | No | No | No | 1987 | |
| 85 | f/1.4 | Minolta AF 85mm f/1.4 G | 2629-118 | 25921? or 27? | 5-pin | 72mm | No | No | No | 1993 | Restyled design |
| 85 | f/1.4 | Minolta AF 85mm f/1.4 G (D) | 2677-118 | 27 | 8-pin | 72mm | Yes | No | No | 2000 | Restyled design |
| 85 | f/1.4 | Minolta AF 85mm f/1.4 G (D) Limited | 2689-118 | 35 | 8-pin | 72mm | Yes | No | No | 2002-05 (2002-03) | Restyled design; revised optics; distributed in Japan only (700 units) |
| 100 | f/2 | Minolta AF 100mm f/2 | 2598-100, 2598-110, 2598-600, 2598-610 | 25981 | 5-pin | 55mm | No | No | No | 1987 | |
| 100 | f/2.8 | Minolta AF Macro 100mm f/2.8 | 2581-100, 2581-600, 2581-610 | 25811 | 5-pin | 55mm | No | No | No | 1986 | 1:1 max. |
| 100 | f/2.8 | Minolta AF Macro 100mm f/2.8 New | 2639-110 | 25811? | 5-pin | 55mm | No | No | No | 1993 | 1:1 max.; restyled design |
| 100 | f/2.8 | Minolta AF Macro 100mm f/2.8 (D) | 2676-110 | 28 | 8-pin | 55mm | Yes | Camera (since 2013-02-05) | Camera | 2000 | 1:1 max.; succeeded by Sony SAL-100M28 |
| 100 | f/2.8 | Minolta AF Soft Focus 100mm f/2.8 | 2648-118 | 12 | 5-pin | 55mm | No | No | No | 1994 | Soft Focus lens |
| 135 | f/2.8 | Minolta AF 135mm f/2.8 | 2556-100, 2556-600 | 25561 | 5-pin | 55mm | No | No | No | 1985-01 | |
| 135 | f/2.8 | Minolta STF 135mm f/2.8 [T4.5] | 2656-118 | 20 | 5-pin | 72mm | No | No | No | 1999 | Smooth Trans Focus; manual focus; aperture ring; succeeded by Sony SAL-135F28 |
Telephoto lenses
| 200 | f/2.8 | Minolta AF Apo Tele 200mm f/2.8 G (Note: Design includes apochromatic lens element(s)) | 2593-100, 2593-600, 2593-610 | 25931 | 5-pin | 72mm | No | No | No | 1986 | Without "High Speed" gearing and sticker and without focus-stop button; white finish |
| 200 | f/2.8 | Minolta AF Apo Tele 200mm f/2.8 G (High Speed upgrade) | Custom upgrade by Minolta service (based on 2593) | 26121? | 5-pin | 72mm | No | No | No | 1988? | With High Speed gearing, but without "High Speed" sticker and without focus-stop button; white finish |
| 200 | f/2.8 | Minolta High Speed AF Apo Tele 200mm f/2.8 G New | 2612-110, 2612-610 | 26121 | 5-pin | 72mm | No | No | No | 1988?, 1989-03 | With "High Speed" label and focus-stop button; white finish |
| 200 | f/4 | Minolta AF Apo Tele Macro 200mm f/4 G | 2658-118 | 23 | 5-pin | 72mm | No | No | No | 1999 | 1:1 max.; also available as calibrated version in conjunction with Minolta CS-1000T spectroradiometer |
| 300 | f/2.8 | Minolta AF Apo Tele 300mm f/2.8 G (original revision) | 2563-626 | 25631 | 5-pin | 114mm (front) / 42mm (slot-in) | No | No | No | 1985-01 | 7-digit serial number; no CLR front filter; tripod knob to the right; without "High Speed" gearing and sticker and without focus-stop buttons; optically based on an SR-mount Minolta MD Apo Tele Rokkor 300mm f/2.8 prototype; white finish |
| 300 | f/2.8 | Minolta AF Apo Tele 300mm f/2.8 G (later revision) | 2563-100, 2563-636 | 25631 | 5-pin | 114mm (front) / 42mm (slot-in) | No | No | No | 1986 | 8-digit serial number; with CLR front filter; tripod knob to the left; without "High Speed" gearing and sticker and without focus-stop buttons; white finish |
| 300 | f/2.8 | Minolta AF Apo Tele 300mm f/2.8 G (High Speed upgrade) | Custom upgrade by Minolta service (based on 2563) | 26081? | 5-pin | 114mm (front) / 42mm (slot-in) | No | No | No | 1988? | 8-digit serial number; with CLR front filter; tripod knob to the left; with "High Speed" gearing, but without "High Speed" sticker and without focus-stop buttons; white finish |
| 300 | f/2.8 | Minolta High Speed AF Apo Tele 300mm f/2.8 G New | 2608-136, 2608-636 | 26081 | 5-pin | 114mm (front) / 42mm (slot-in) | No | No | No | 1988?, 1989-03 | 8-digit serial number; with CLR front filter; tripod knob to the left; with "High Speed" label and focus-stop buttons; white finish |
| 300 | f/2.8 | Minolta AF Apo Tele 300mm f/2.8 G (D) SSM | 2674-118 | 32 | 8-pin | None (front) / 42mm (slot-in) | Yes | Camera (since 2013-02-05) | No | 2003 (2002-03) | White finish; succeeded by Sony SAL-300F28G |
| 300 | f/4 | Minolta High Speed AF Apo Tele 300mm f/4 G | 2640-128 | 11 | 5-pin | 82mm (front) / 42mm (slot-in) | No | No | No | 1994 | White finish |
| 400 | f/4.5 | Minolta High Speed AF Apo Tele 400mm f/4.5 G | 2651-116 | 15 | 5-pin | 95mm (front) / 42mm (slot-in) | No | No | No | 1995 | White finish |
| 500 | f/8 | Minolta AF Reflex 500mm f/8 | 2572-118, 2572-618 | 25721 | 5-pin | 82mm (front) / 28mm (slot-in) / 42mm (slot-in) | No | No | No | 1989-03 | Catadioptric lens; succeeded by Sony SAL-500F80 |
| 600 | f/4 | Minolta AF Apo Tele 600mm f/4 G | 2565-100, 2565-626, 2565-636 | 25651 | 5-pin | 154.5mm (front) / 42mm (slot-in) | No | No | No | 1985-08 | Without "High Speed" gearing and label and without focus-stop buttons; white finish |
| 600 | f/4 | Minolta AF Apo Tele 600mm f/4 G (High Speed upgrade) | Custom upgrade by Minolta service (based on 2565) | 26091? | 5-pin | 154.5mm (front) / 42mm (slot-in) | No | No | No | 1988? | With "High Speed" gearing, but without "High Speed" label and without focus-stop buttons; white finish |
| 600 | f/4 | Minolta High Speed AF Apo Tele 600mm f/4 G New | 2609-136, 2609-636 | 26091 | 5-pin | 154.5mm (front) / 42mm (slot-in) | No | No | No | 1988?, 1989-03 | With "High Speed" label and with focus-stop buttons; white finish |
Zoom lenses
Wide-angle and special purpose zoom lenses
| 3×–1× | f/1.7–2.8 | Minolta AF Macro Zoom 3×-1× f/1.7-2.8 | 2594-116, 2594-616 | 25941 | 5-pin | 46mm | No | No | No | 1990 | 3:1 max.; white finish; also available as calibrated version in conjunction with Minolta CS-1000S spectroradiometer |
| 11–18 | f/4.5–5.6 | Konica Minolta AF Zoom DT 11-18mm f/4.5-5.6 (D) (Note: DT is "Digital Technology", lenses for cameras with APS-C (or Super-35mm) size sensors, only. DT lenses will not fully illuminate the sensor/film area of 24×36mm full-frame cameras. Three DT lenses were made and sold by Konica Minolta: 11–18, 18–70, and 18–200mm.) | 2698-110 | 41 | 8-pin | 77mm | Yes | No | No | 2005 | Derivation of Tamron SP AF 11-18mm f/4.5-5.6 Di II LD Aspherical [IF] (model A13M) design; succeeded by Sony SAL-1118 |
| 17–35 | f/2.8–4 | Konica Minolta AF Zoom 17-35mm f/2.8-4 (D) | 2695-110 | 38 | 8-pin | 77mm | Yes | No | No | 2004 | Derivation of Tamron SP AF 17-35mm f/2.8-4 Di LD Aspherical [IF] (model A05M) design; black finish |
| 17–35 | f/3.5 | Minolta AF Zoom 17-35mm f/3.5 G | 2654-118 | 16 | 5-pin | 77mm | No | No | No | 1997 | Black finish |
| 20–35 | f/3.5–4.5 | Minolta AF Zoom 20-35mm f/3.5-4.5 | 2657-118 | 17 | 5-pin | 72mm | No | No | No | 1998 | |
Wide to normal/tele zoom lenses
| 18–70 | f/3.5–5.6 | Konica Minolta AF Zoom DT 18-70mm f/3.5-5.6 (D) | 2697-810 | 40 | 8-pin | 55mm | Yes | No | No | 2005 | Succeeded by Sony SAL-1870 |
| 18–200 | f/3.5–6.3 | Konica Minolta AF Zoom DT 18-200mm f/3.5-6.3 (D) | 2699-110 | 42 | 8-pin | 62mm | Yes | No | No | 2005 | Derivation of Tamron AF 18-200mm f/3.5-6.3 XR Di II LD Aspherical [IF] (model A14M) design; succeeded by Sony SAL-18200 |
| 24–50 | f/4 | Minolta AF Zoom 24-50mm f/4 | 2558-100, 2558-110, 2558-600, 2558-610 | 25581 | 5-pin | 55mm | No | No | No | 1987 | Black finish |
| 24–50 | f/4 | Minolta AF Zoom 24-50mm f/4 New | 2632-110 | 26321? | 5-pin | 55mm | No | No | No | 1992 | Restyled design |
| 24–85 | f/3.5–4.5 | Minolta AF Zoom 24-85mm f/3.5-4.5 | 2636-110 | 6? | 5-pin | 62mm | No | No | No | 1993 | Also available as limited red-brown Urushi-lacquered Minolta AF Zoom 24-85mm f/3.5-4.5 Japan variant |
| 24–85 | f/3.5–4.5 | Minolta AF Zoom 24-85mm f/3.5-4.5 New | 2660-110 | 6 | 5-pin | 62mm | No | No | No | 1997 | Restyled design |
| 24–105 | f/3.5–4.5 | Minolta AF Zoom 24-105mm f/3.5-4.5 (D) | 2672-110 | 24 | 8-pin | 62mm | Yes | No | No | 2000 | Succeeded by Sony SAL-24105 |
| 28–70 | f/2.8 | Minolta AF Zoom 28-70mm f/2.8 G | 2620-118 | 2 | 5-pin | 72mm | No | No | No | 1993 | Black finish |
| 28–70 | f/2.8 | Minolta AF Zoom 28-70mm f/2.8 G (D) SSM | 2686-118 | 34? | 8-pin | 77mm | Yes | Yes | No | N/A (2002–03) | Prototype only, announced on 2002-03-19 and publicly shown up to 2004, but never released; black finish |
| 28–75 | f/2.8 | Konica Minolta AF Zoom 28-75mm f/2.8 (D) | 2696-810 | 39 | 8-pin | 67mm | Yes | No | No | 2004 | Derivation of Tamron SP AF 28-75mm f/2.8 XR Di LD Aspherical [IF] Macro (model A09M) design; black finish; succeeded by Sony SAL-2875 |
| 28–80 | f/3.5–5.6 | Minolta AF Zoom 28-80mm f/3.5-5.6 | 2659-100, 2659-110 | 4? or 18? | 5-pin | ? | No | No | No | ? | |
| 28–80 | f/3.5–5.6 | Minolta AF Zoom 28-80mm f/3.5-5.6 II | 2670-110, 2670-150, 2670-160 | 18 | 5-pin | 62mm | No | No | No | 1987 | Restyled design |
| 28–80 | f/3.5–5.6 | Minolta AF Zoom 28-80mm f/3.5-5.6 (D) | 2683-900, 2683-910, 2683-950, 2683-960 | 30 | 8-pin | 55mm | Yes | No | No | 2001 | Restyled design; black or silver finish |
| 28–80 | f/4–5.6 | Minolta AF Zoom xi 28-80mm f/4-5.6 | 2618-110 | 26181 | 8-pin | 55mm | No | No | No | 1991 | Black finish |
| 28–80 | f/4–5.6 | Minolta AF Macro Zoom 28-80mm f/4-5.6 New | 2633-100, 2633-110 | 3 | 5-pin | 55mm | No | No | No | 1993 | Black finish |
| 28–85 | f/3.5–4.5 | Minolta AF Macro Zoom 28-85mm f/3.5-4.5 | 2552-100, 2552-600, 2552-610 | 25521 | 5-pin | 55mm | No | No | No | 1985-01 | |
| 28–85 | f/3.5–4.5 | Minolta AF Macro Zoom 28-85mm f/3.5-4.5 New | 2586-110, 2586-610 | 0 | 5-pin | 55mm | No | No | No | 1992 | Restyled design |
| 28–100 | f/3.5–5.6 | Minolta AF Zoom 28-100mm f/3.5-5.6 (D) | 2692-810, 2692-860 | 36 | 8-pin | 55mm | Yes | No | No | 2003 | Black or silver finish |
| 28–105 | f/3.5–4.5 | Minolta AF Zoom xi 28-105mm f/3.5-4.5 | 2615-110 | 26151? | 8-pin | 62mm | No | No | No | 1991 | Black finish |
| 28–105 | f/3.5–4.5 | Minolta AF Zoom 28-105mm f/3.5-4.5 | 2635-110 | 10 | 5-pin | 62mm | No | No | No | 1994 | Restyled design |
| 28–105 | f/3.5–4.5 | Minolta AF Zoom 28-105mm f/3.5-4.5 New | 2661-110 | 10? | 5-pin | 62mm | No | No | No | 1997 | Restyled design |
| 28–135 | f/4–4.5 | Minolta AF Macro Zoom 28-135mm f/4-4.5 | 2553-100, 2553-600 | 25531 | 5-pin | 72mm | No | No | No | 1985-01 | Black finish |
| 35–70 | f/3.5–4.5 | Minolta AF Zoom 35-70mm f/3.5-4.5 | 2643-100 | 5? | 5-pin | 49mm | No | No | No | 1993 | Black finish; has focusing scale window |
| 35–70 | f/3.5–4.5 | Minolta AF Zoom 35-70mm f/3.5-4.5 II? / New? | 2652-100 | 5? | 5-pin | 49mm | No | No | No | ? | Black finish; has no focusing scale |
| 35–70 | f/4 | Minolta AF Macro Zoom 35-70mm f/4 | 2551-100, 2551-600, 2551-610 | 25511 | 5-pin | 49mm | No | No | No | 1985-01 | Black finish |
| 35–80 | f/4–5.6 | Minolta AF Zoom 35-80mm f/4-5.6 | 2605-100, 2605-110, 2605-600 | 26071 | 5-pin | 46mm | No | No | No | 1988-10 | |
| 35–80 | f/4–5.6 | Minolta AF Power Zoom 35-80mm f/4-5.6 | 2624-110 | 26241 | 8-pin | 49mm | No | No | No | 1991 | Restyled design; black finish |
| 35–80 | f/4–5.6 | Minolta AF Zoom 35-80mm f/4-5.6 II | 2671-110, 2671-160 | 22 | 5-pin | 49mm | No | No | No | 1999 | Restyled design |
| 35–105 | f/3.5–4.5 | Minolta AF Macro Zoom 35-105mm f/3.5-4.5 | 2554-100, 2554-600, 2554-610 | 25541 | 5-pin | 55mm | No | No | No | 1985-01 | |
| 35–105 | f/3.5–4.5 | Minolta AF Zoom 35-105mm f/3.5-4.5 New | 2585-100, 2585-600, 2585-610 | 25858 | 5-pin | 55mm | No | No | No | 1988-10 | Restyled design; white finish version available as Minolta AF Zoom 35-105mm f/3.5-4.5 Prestige (2585-110?) |
| 35–200 | f/4.5–5.6 | Minolta AF Zoom xi 35-200mm f/4.5-5.6 | 2616-110, 2616-610 | 26161? | 8-pin | 62mm | No | No | No | 1991 | Black finish |
Telephoto zoom lenses
| 70–200 | f/2.8 | Minolta AF Apo Tele Zoom 70-200mm f/2.8 G (D) SSM | 2682-118 | 33 | 8-pin | 77mm | Yes | No | No | 2003 (2002-03) | White finish; succeeded by Sony SAL-70200G |
| 70–210 | f/3.5–4.5 | Minolta AF Zoom 70-210mm f/3.5-4.5 | 2588-100, 2588-600, 2588-610, (2588-810) | 25881? | 5-pin | 55mm | No | No | No | 1988-10 | |
| 70–210 | f/4 | Minolta AF Zoom 70-210mm f/4 | 2555-100, 2555-110, 2555-600, 2555-610 | 25551 | 5-pin | 55mm | No | No | No | 1985-01 | Optically based on the Minolta MD Zoom 70-210mm f/4 (a.k.a. Leica Vario-Elmar-R 70-210mm f/4); black finish, also available as "dealer demo" in transparent housing |
| 70–210 | f/4.5–5.6 | Minolta AF Zoom 70-210mm f/4.5-5.6 (New?) | 2634-110 | 8 | 5-pin | 49mm | No | No | No | 1993 | |
| 70–210 | f/4.5–5.6 | Minolta AF Zoom 70-210mm f/4.5-5.6 II | 2669-110, 2669-160 | 8? | 5-pin | 49mm | No | No | No | 1999 | |
| 75–300 | f/4.5–5.6 | Minolta AF Zoom 75-300mm f/4.5-5.6 | 2561-100, 2561-110, 2561-600, 2561-610 | 25611 | 5-pin | 55mm | No | No | No | 1985-08 | Black finish |
| 75–300 | f/4.5–5.6 | Minolta AF Zoom 75-300mm f/4.5-5.6 New | 2649-110 | 13? | 5-pin | 55mm | No | No | No | 1996 | Black finish |
| 75–300 | f/4.5–5.6 | Minolta AF Zoom 75-300mm f/4.5-5.6 II | 2665-110, 2665-160 | 13? | 5-pin | 55mm | No | No | No | 1999 | Black or silver finish |
| 75–300 | f/4.5–5.6 | Minolta AF Zoom 75-300mm f/4.5-5.6 (D) | 2684-910, 2684-960 | 29 | 8-pin | 55mm | Yes | No | No | 2001 | Black or silver finish; succeeded by Sony SAL-75300 |
| 80–200 | f/2.8 | Minolta AF Apo Tele Zoom 80-200mm f/2.8 G | 2589-100, 2589-600, 2589-610 | 25891 | 5-pin | 72mm | No | No | No | 1987 | Black finish |
| 80–200 | f/2.8 | Minolta High Speed AF Apo Tele Zoom 80-200mm f/2.8 G (New?) | 2628-118 | 1 | 5-pin | 72mm | No | No | No | 1993 | White finish |
| 80–200 | f/4.5–5.6 | Minolta AF Zoom 80-200mm f/4.5-5.6 | 2604-100, 2604-600 | 26041? | 5-pin | 46mm | No | No | No | 1988-10 | Black finish |
| 80–200 | f/4.5–5.6 | Minolta AF Zoom xi 80-200mm f/4.5-5.6 | 2619-110, 2619-610 | 26191? | 8-pin | 55mm | No | No | No | 1991 | Black finish |
| 100–200 | f/4.5 | Minolta AF Zoom 100-200mm f/4.5 | 2560-100, 2560-600, 2560-610, 2560-611 | 25601 | 5-pin | 49mm | No | No | No | 1986 | Black finish |
| 100–300 | f/4.5–5.6 | Minolta AF Zoom 100-300mm f/4.5-5.6 | 2606-100, 2606-110, 2606-600, 2606-610 | 26061? | 5-pin | 55mm | No | No | No | 1988-10 | Black finish |
| 100–300 | f/4.5–5.6 | Minolta AF Zoom xi 100-300mm f/4.5-5.6 | 2621-110 | 26211? | 8-pin | 55mm | No | No | No | 1991 | Black finish |
| 100–300 | f/4.5–5.6 | Minolta AF Apo Tele Zoom 100-300mm f/4.5-5.6 | 2631-? | 7 | 5-pin | 55mm | No | No | No | 1993? | Black finish; smooth rubber focus ring |
| 100–300 | f/4.5–5.6 | Minolta AF Apo Tele Zoom 100-300mm f/4.5-5.6 New | 2631-110? | 7? | 5-pin | 55mm | No | No | No | 1995? | Black finish; ribbed focus ring |
| 100–300 | f/4.5–5.6 | Minolta AF Apo Tele Zoom 100-300mm f/4.5-5.6 (D) | 2681-110 | 25 | 8-pin | 55mm | Yes | No | No | 2000 | Black finish |
| 100–400 | f/4.5–6.7 | Minolta AF Apo Tele Zoom 100-400mm f/4.5-6.7 | 2644-110 | 14 | 5-pin | 72mm | No | No | No | 1995 | Black finish |
Teleconverters
| 1.4× | 1.4× | Minolta AF 1.4× Tele Converter Apo | 2590-100, 2590-600, 2590-607 | 25901 | 5-pin | N/A | No | No | No | 1986 | Not recommended for lenses with "High Speed" gearing; white finish |
| 1.4× | 1.4× | Minolta AF 1.4× Tele Converter Apo-II | 2610-107, 2610-607 | Lens ID of mounted lens or 65535 (no lens) | 5-pin | N/A | No | No | ? | 1988?, 1989-03 | White finish |
| 1.4× | 1.4× | Minolta AF 1.4× Tele Converter Apo (D) | 2687-107 | Lens ID of mounted lens or 65535 (no lens) | 8-pin | N/A | Yes | No | ? | 2003 (2002-03) | Recommended for SSM/ADI; white finish; succeeded by Sony SAL-14TC |
| 2× | 2× | Minolta AF 2× Tele Converter Apo | 2601-100, 2601-600, 2601-607 | 26011 | 5-pin | N/A | No | No | No | 1987 | Not recommended for lenses with "High Speed" gearing; white finish |
| 2× | 2× | Minolta AF 2× Tele Converter Apo-II | 2611-107, 2611-607 | Lens ID of mounted lens or 65535 (no lens) | 5-pin | N/A | No | No | ? | 1988?, 1989-03 | White finish |
| 2× | 2× | Minolta AF 2× Tele Converter Apo (D) | 2688-107 | Lens ID of mounted lens or 65535 (no lens) | 8-pin | N/A | Yes | No | ? | 2003 (2002-03) | Recommended for SSM/ADI; white finish; succeeded by Sony SAL-20TC |
| 2× | 2× | Minolta AF 2× M/A Converter-S | 2583-107 | 65535 (no chip) | 0-pin | N/A | No | No | No | 1985-08 | For use of SR-mount lenses shorter than 300mm on A-mount bodies; black finish; optically identical to Minolta MD 2× Tele Converter 300-S |
| 2× | 2× | Minolta AF 2× M/A Converter-L | 2584-107, (2583-207) | 65535 (no chip) | 0-pin | N/A | No | No | No | 1985-08 | For use of SR-mount lenses longer than 300mm on A-mount bodies; black finish; optically identical to Minolta MD 2× Tele Converter 300-L |
Special purpose lenses
| 50 | f/1.7 | Minolta AF Master Lens 50mm f/1.7 | 2072-0006-75 | 25501? | 5-pin | 49mm | No | No | No | 1985 | Specially calibrated lens with fixed focus and fixed aperture for camera service; optics based on Minolta AF 50mm f/1.7 (2550-100, 2550-600); cannot be used for normal photography; black finish |

Notes

Notes and nomenclature
| Apo | Apochromatic lens element(s) |
| (D) or D | "Distance encoder", lens provides subject distance information for utilization in the Advanced Distance Integration (ADI) flash mode and other features. While the "(D)" designation is used on the box and in the documentation, the lenses just feature a "D" instead. Requires 8 lens contacts; lenses with only 5 contacts cannot support this feature. |
| DT | "Digital Technology", lenses for cameras with APS-C (or Super-35mm) size sensors, only. DT lenses will not fully illuminate the sensor/film area of 24×36mm full-frame cameras. Three DT lenses were made and sold by Konica Minolta: 11–18, 18–70, and 18–200mm. |
| G | "Gold" series, Minolta's line-up of high-grade lenses. The "G" status does not occur as label on the lenses, but is indicated by a decorating ring on the lens. |
| High Speed | High Speed upgraded gearing for faster autofocus. As indicated, three lenses were upgradeable in authorized service centers as well. |
| II | Version II. Some lenses underwent more than just cosmetic changes, and are referred to as second version, in particular, when the optics have changed completely. |
| New | Restyled (not a designation found on the lens), aesthetic changes (such lenses were labelled "New" or "Neu" or "(N)" on the box and in the documentation by Minolta, but not specifically labelled on the lens itself). |
| SSM | "SuperSonic Motor", silent in-lens ultrasonic motor used on some lenses. Requires 8 lens contacts; lenses with only 5 contacts cannot support this feature. Can be used with manual focusing on cameras without SSM support (that is, Minolta film bodies released before 2000 - Minolta Dynax/Maxxum/α-9/9Ti can be upgraded by service). |
| Power or xi | Motorized zoom. Requires 8 lens contacts; lenses with only 5 contacts cannot support this feature. |

== See also ==
- List of Konica Minolta A-mount lenses
- List of Minolta A-mount cameras
- List of Konica Minolta A-mount cameras
- List of Sony A-mount cameras
- List of Minolta V-mount lenses
- List of Minolta SR-mount lenses
- List of Sony A-mount lenses
