= Minolta AF 35mm f/1.4 =

Minolta SLR A-mount prime lens

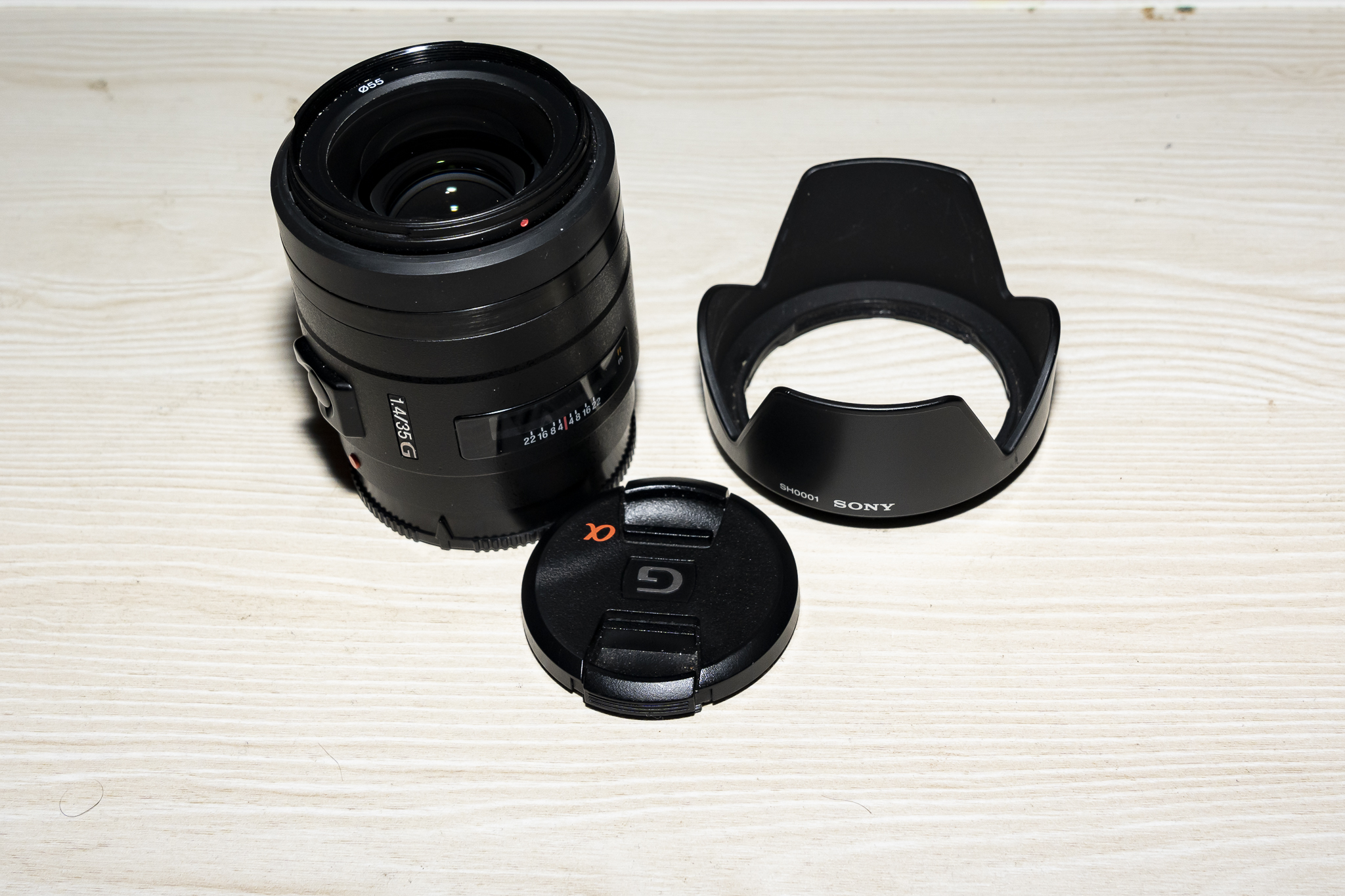
- Maker: Minolta, Sony

Technical data
- Type: Prime
- Focal length: 35mm
- Aperture (max/min): f/1.4
- Close focus distance: 300mm
- Max. magnification: 1/5
- Diaphragm blades: 9
- Construction: 10 elements in 8 groups

Features
- Application: Normal wide-aperture prime

Physical
- Diameter: 55mm
- Weight: 512 g

Accessories
- Lens hood: bayonet, flower

History
- Introduction: 1987

Retail info
- MSRP: 1400 USD (as of 2006)

Minolta AF 35mm f/1.4 lens is a camera lens that was introduced by Minolta in 1987 (originally as a non-G lens), and revised in 1998 as Minolta AF 35mm f/1.4 G New. In 2005, Konica Minolta announced the Konica Minolta AF 35mm f/1.4 G (D) with revised optics, mechanics and distance encoder. This version was never released, but saw life as Sony α 35mm f/1.4 G (SAL-35F14G) in 2006, released by Sony. The 35mm f/1.4 G is compatible with cameras using the Minolta AF and Sony α lens mounts.

== See also ==
- List of Minolta A-mount lenses

== Sources ==
- Dyxum lens data
