= Minolta AF 50mm f/1.4 =

Minolta SLR A-mount prime lens

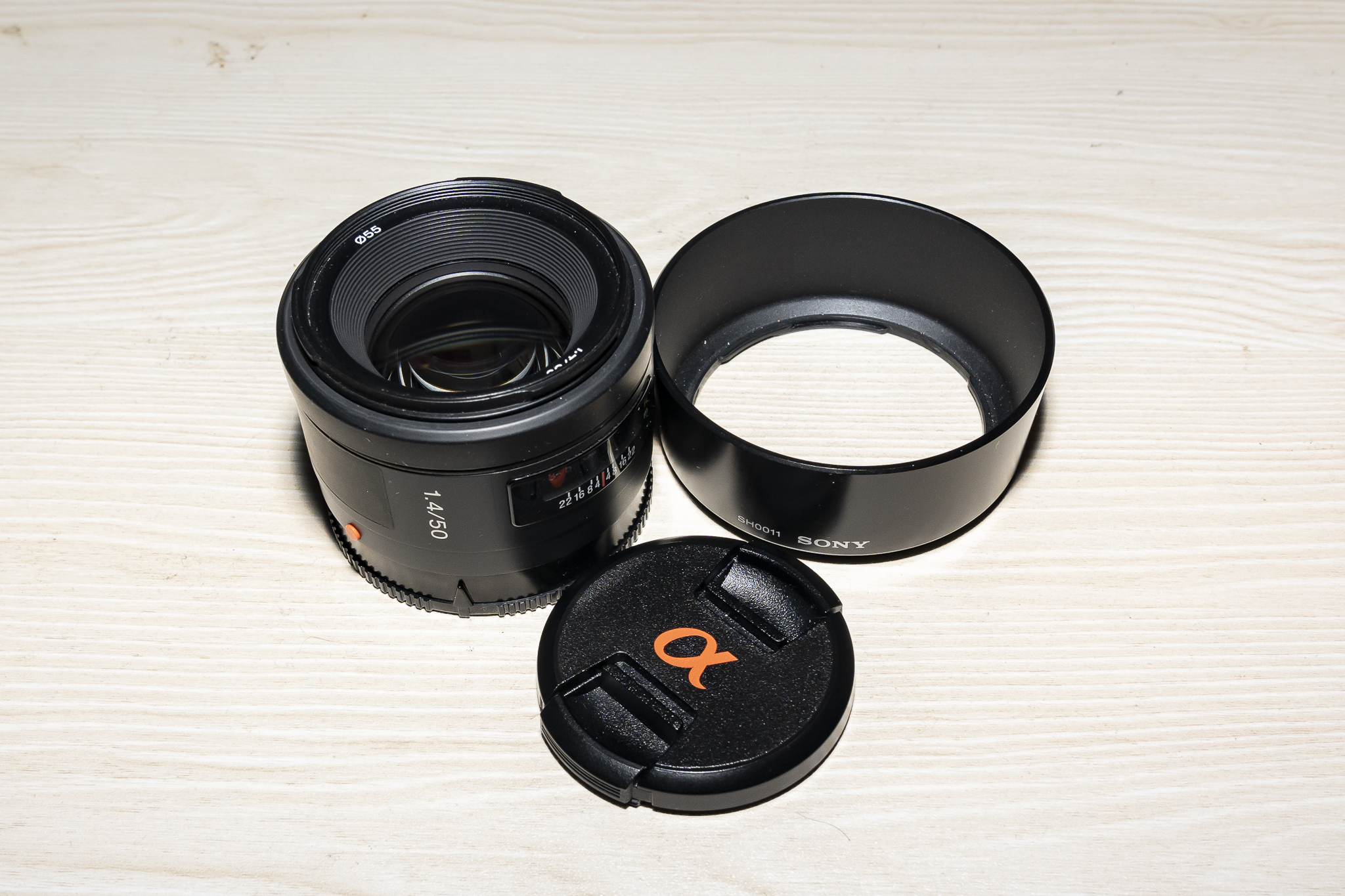
- Maker: Minolta, Sony

Technical data
- Type: Prime
- Focal length: 50mm
- Crop factor: 47°
- Aperture (max/min): f/1.4 - f/22
- Close focus distance: 450 mm
- Max. magnification: 1/6.66
- Diaphragm blades: 7 circular
- Construction: 7 elements in 6 groups

Features
- Application: Normal wide-aperture prime

Physical
- Max. length: 43 mm
- Diameter: 65 mm
- Weight: 220 g
- Filter diameter: 55 mm

Accessories
- Lens hood: bayonet, circular

History
- Introduction: 1985
- Predecessor: 1985, 1990 "restyled"
- Successor: Sony SAL-50F14

Retail info
- MSRP: 350 USD (as of 2006)

Originally, produced by Minolta, and currently produced by Sony, the 50mm f/1.4 is a normal wide-aperture prime photographic lens compatible with cameras using the Minolta AF and Sony α lens mounts.

== See also ==
- List of Minolta A-mount lenses

== Sources ==
- Dyxum lens data and reviews
