= Minolta AF Apo Tele 300mm f/2.8 =

Photographic lens

Minolta AF 300mm f/2.8 APO
- Maker: Minolta, Sony

Technical data
- Type: Prime
- Focal length: 300mm
- Aperture (max/min): f/2.8–32
- Close focus distance: 2.5 m (8.2 ft)
- Max. magnification: 1:7.14
- Diaphragm blades: 7–9, circular
- Construction: 11 elements in 9 groups

Features
- Unique features: y
- Application: Fast telephoto prime

Physical
- Max. length: 238.1 mm (9 3/8 in)
- Diameter: 128.6 mm (5 1/16 in)
- Weight: 2,480 g (87 1/2 oz)
- Filter diameter: drop-in

Accessories
- Lens hood: bayonet, circular

Angle of view
- Diagonal: 8°10'

History
- Introduction: 1985
- Discontinuation: 2022
- Successor: Sony SAL-300F28G

Retail info
- MSRP: 7500 USD (as of 2015)

Originally produced by Minolta starting in 1985, then produced by Sony from 2006 until 2022, the AF Apo Tele 300mm f/2.8 is a professional telephoto prime photographic lens compatible with cameras using the Minolta A-mount and Sony A-mount lens mounts. The name indicates it has an apochromatic design and is part of the G series, Minolta's designation for high-performance lenses. Later versions included "High Speed" gearing; starting in 2003, the lens was recomputed with a new optical design and equipped with a focusing distance encoder for the Advance Distance Integration (ADI) flash system.

== History ==
The 300 mm f/2.8 APO was introduced in 1985 as one of the original dozen lenses released with the Maxxum/Dynax 7000. Like contemporary Canon FD super-telephoto lenses, it was available exclusively with a white finish to reflect the sun, minimizing the effect of thermal expansion on optical alignment, and carried a gold ring towards the front of the lens, designating it as a (G)old series lens. Its optical design uses two "anomalous dispersion" glass elements.

Around 1988, Minolta released an updated version of the lens with a faster gear ratio to increase autofocus speed; in 1989, Minolta added AF stop buttons behind the focusing ring (i.e., closer to the lens mount end of the lens) and began labeling these new lenses as "High Speed". Older lenses could be upgraded, but these retrofitted lenses and early updated versions may not include the "High Speed" label. In 1999, the manufacturer-suggested retail price was US$6,889 (equivalent to $13,000 in 2024).

In 2003, Minolta recomputed the optical formula for the lens, decreasing the minimum focusing distance, and released it with an 8-pin electronic interface for the ADI system and a ring-type ultrasonic motor (labeled SSM) for focusing. Externally, this lens may be distinguished from earlier versions by the relocated focusing stop buttons, now forward of the focusing ring, and the presence of a large switch panel on the side of the lens, behind the focusing ring, which includes a focusing distance limiter and an electronic preset focusing distance; prior versions had a mechanical preset. The SSM lens can be mounted to all Maxxum/Dynax cameras, but the autofocus will work only with bodies newer than (and including) the Maxxum/Dynax 7.

This version was adopted and re-released by Sony with minor cosmetic updates after it acquired the Konica Minolta camera division in 2006. The last A-mount version to be sold by Sony, the 300 mm f/2.8 G SSM II, was introduced in 2012, with improvements to the lens coating and focusing speed.

Sony discontinued the A-mount, including lenses, by 2022. In 2023, Sony released a lens with identical focal length and speed for mirrorless cameras, the FE 300mm F2.8 GM OSS, which features a native E-mount and optical image stabilization.

Minolta / Konica Minolta / Sony AF 300 mm f/2.8 APO
Lens Spec		Minolta AF APO Tele 300 mm f/2.8	Minolta (HS) AF APO Tele 300 mm f/2.8	Minolta AF 300 mm f/2.8 APO G (D) SSM	Sony 300 mm f/2.8G SSM	Sony 300 mm f/2.8G SSM II
Model no.					SAL-300F28G	SAL-300F28G2
Year		1985	1988	2003	2006	2012
Focal length		300 mm				
Aperture		f/2.8–32, 7-blade	f/2.8–32, 7- or 9-blade	f/2.8–32, 9-blade		
Const.	Ele.	11 (2 AD)		13 (3 AD/ED)		
Const.	Grp.	9		12		
ADI		No		Yes		
Focus	Min.	2.5 m (8.2 ft)		2.0 m (6.6 ft)		
Focus	Limiter	Yes, mechanical		Yes, electronic		
Focus	AF stop	No	Maybe	Yes		
Dims.	Dia.	128.6 mm (5 1/16 in)		122.2 mm (4 13/16 in)		123.8 mm (4 7/8 in)
Dims.	Len.	238.1 mm (9 3/8 in)		242.9 mm (9 9/16 in)		244.5 mm (9 5/8 in)
Dims.	Wgt.	2,480 g (5 lb 7.5 oz)		2,310 g (5 lb 1.5 oz)		2,340 g (5 lb 2.5 oz)
Dims.	Filter (mm)	114 (front)		— (permanent protective optical flat)		
Dims.	Filter (mm)	42 (rear drop-in)				
Refs.						

== See also ==
- List of Minolta A-mount lenses
