= Minolta AF 24mm f/2.8 =

Minolta SLR A-mount prime lens

Minolta AF 24mm f/2.8 lens
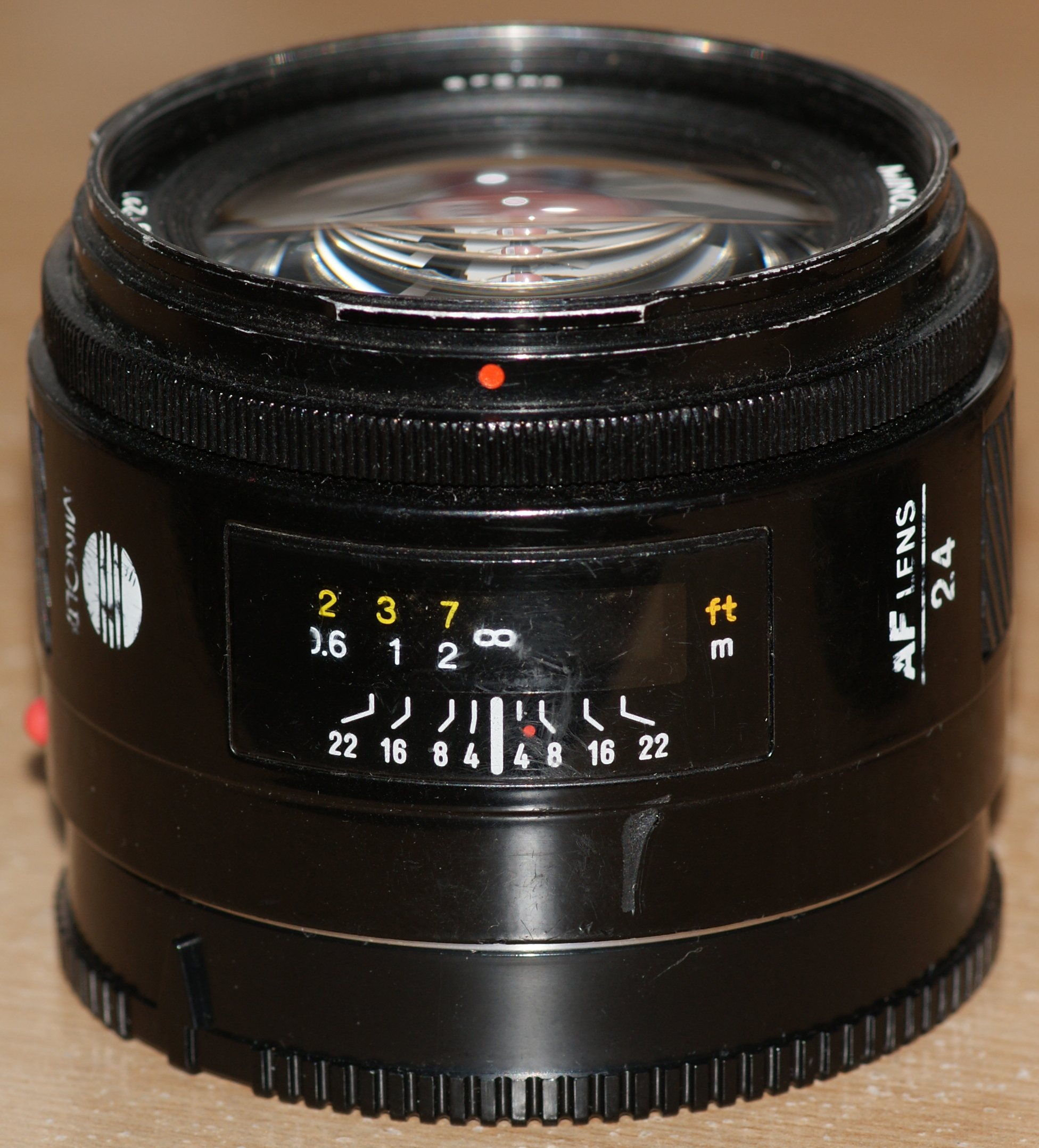
- Maker: Minolta

Technical data
- Type: Prime
- Focal length: 24mm
- Aperture (max/min): f/2.8 - f/22
- Close focus distance: 250 mm
- Max. magnification: 1/6.5
- Diaphragm blades: 7
- Construction: 8 elements in 8 groups

Features
- Application: Normal wide-aperture prime

Physical
- Max. length: 55 mm
- Diameter: 55 mm
- Weight: 215 g

Accessories
- Lens hood: integrated, round

History
- Introduction: 1985

Retail info
- MSRP: 250 USD

Originally produced by Minolta, the 24mm f/2.8 is compatible with cameras using the Minolta AF and Sony α lens mounts.

== See also ==
- List of Minolta A-mount lenses

== Sources ==
- Dyxum lens data - Minolta AF 24 F2.8 2566-110
- Dyxum lens data - Minolta AF 24 F2.8 RS 2642-110
