= Minolta AF 28mm f/2.8 =

Minolta SLR A-mount prime lens

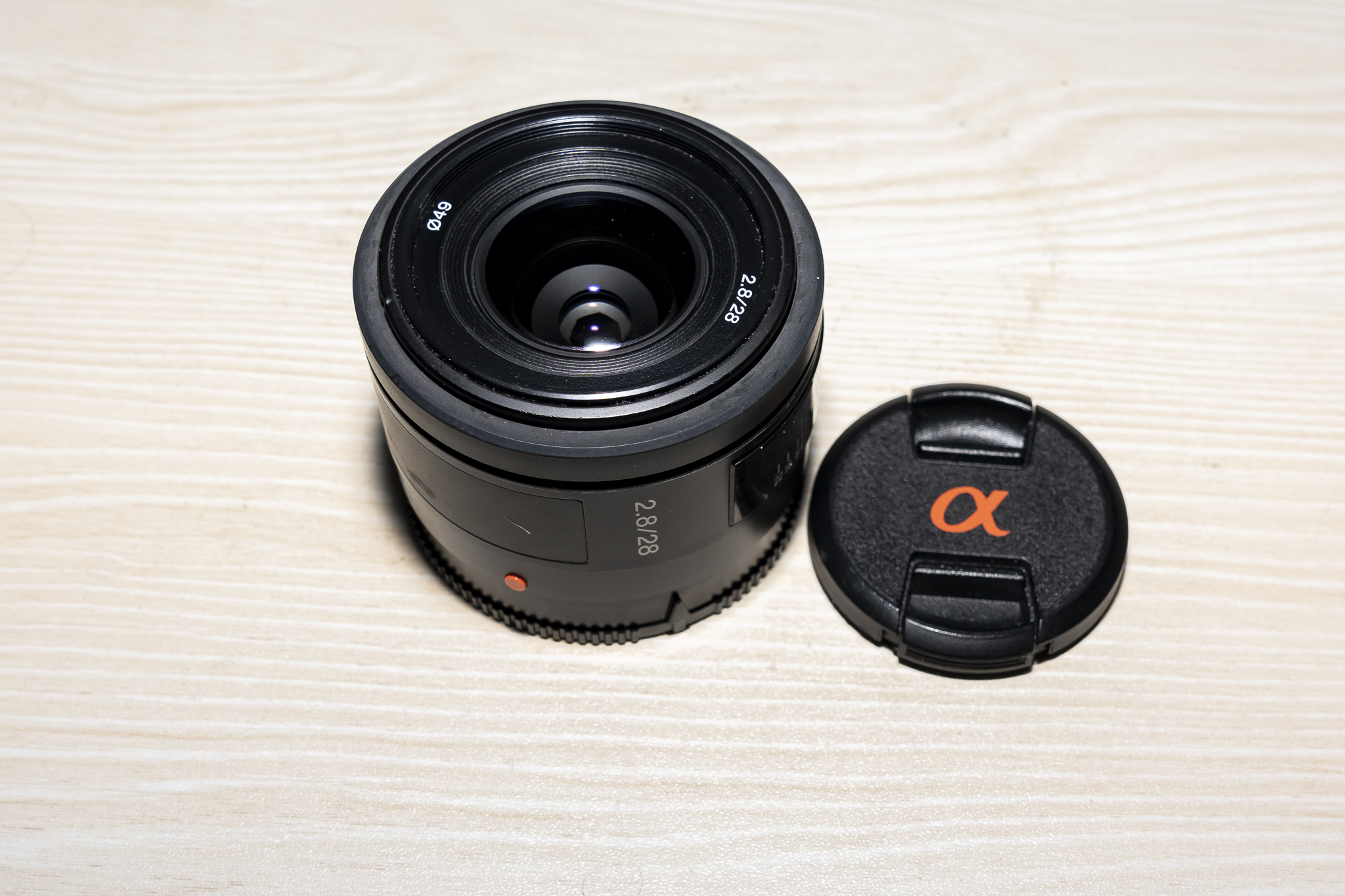
- Maker: Minolta, Sony

Technical data
- Type: Prime
- Focal length: 28mm
- Aperture (max/min): f/2.8 - f/22
- Close focus distance: 300 mm
- Max. magnification: 1/7.7
- Diaphragm blades: 7
- Construction: 5 elements in 5 groups

Features
- Application: Normal wide-aperture prime

Physical
- Max. length: 54 mm
- Diameter: 49 mm
- Weight: 185 g

Accessories
- Lens hood: integrated, round

History
- Introduction: 2006 Sony

Retail info
- MSRP: 250 USD

The Minolta AF 28mm f/2.8 is a camera lens originally produced by Minolta, and produced by Sony after Sony took over Minolta's AF SLR and DSLR business. It is compatible with cameras using the Minolta AF and Sony α lens mounts. Since Sony introduced their mirrorless interchangeable lens cameras with their "E-Mount", Sony offers various A-to-E Mount adaptors (LA-EA 1/2/3/4/5) to allow use of legacy A-Mount lenses on E-Mount cameras.

== See also ==
- List of Minolta A-mount lenses

== Sources ==
- Dyxum lens data
