= Minolta AF Zoom 24-105mm f/3.5-4.5 (D) =

Type of photographic lens

- Maker: Minolta, Sony

Technical data
- Type: Zoom
- Focal length: 24-105mm
- Aperture (max/min): f/3.5-4.5
- Close focus distance: 500 mm
- Max. magnification: 1/5.49
- Diaphragm blades: 7, circular
- Construction: 12 elements in 11 groups

Features
- Application: Telephoto zoom lens

Physical
- Max. length: 108 mm
- Diameter: 62 mm
- Weight: 432 g

Accessories
- Lens hood: bayonet, flower

History
- Introduction: 2001 Minolta

Retail info
- MSRP: 470 USD (as of 2006)

Originally produced by Minolta, and after the Minolta/Sony merger produced by Sony, the 24-105mm f/3.5-4.5 (D) was compatible with cameras using the Minolta AF and Sony α lens mounts.

== See also ==
- List of Minolta A-mount lenses

== Sources ==
- Dyxum lens data
- Dyxum Sony variant lens data
