= Minolta AF 50mm f/1.7 =

Minolta SLR A-mount prime lens

Minolta 50mm f/1.7
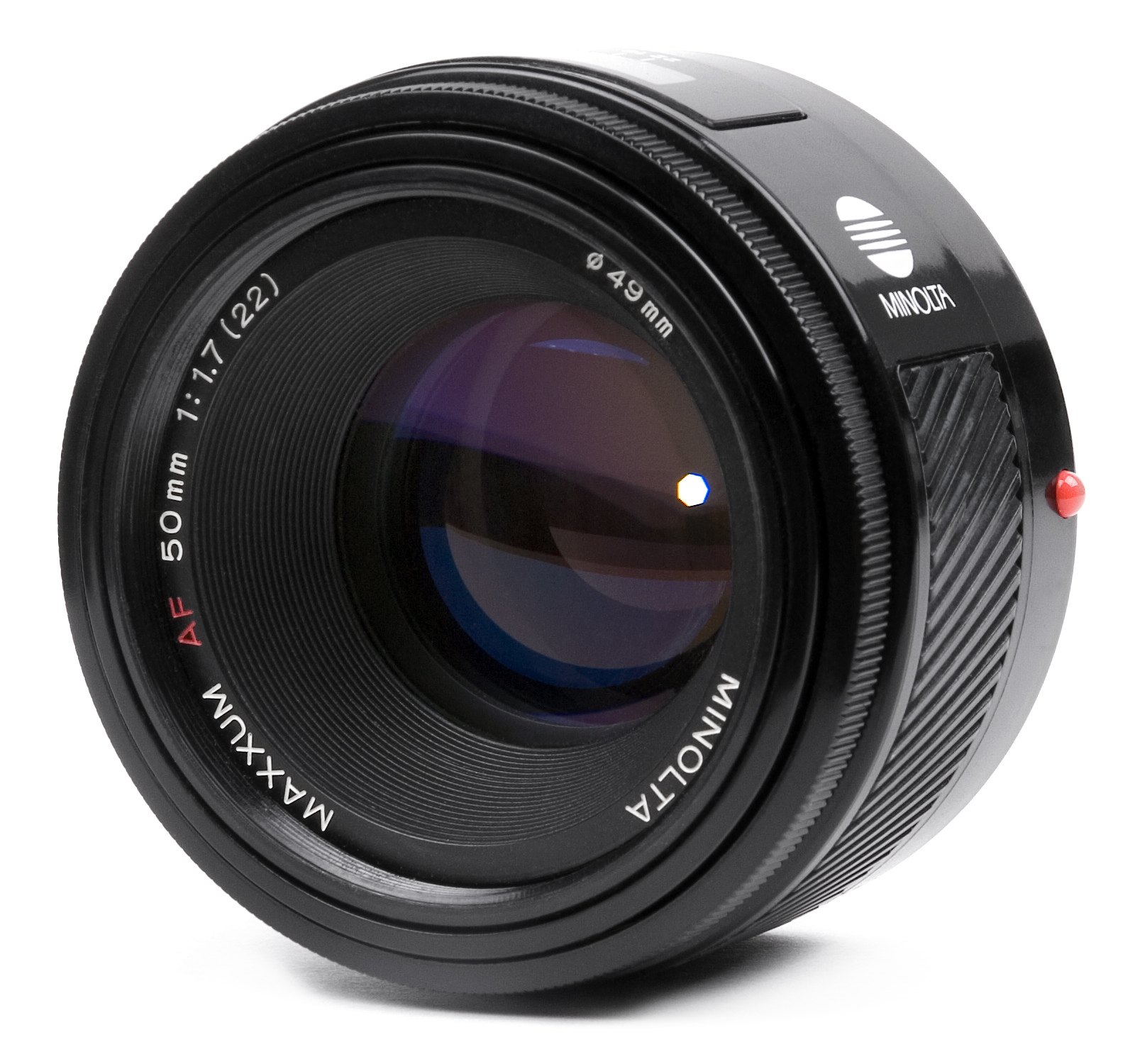
- Maker: Minolta

Technical data
- Type: Prime
- Focal length: 50mm
- Aperture (max/min): f/1.7 - f/22
- Close focus distance: 45 cm
- Max. magnification: 1:6.67
- Diaphragm blades: 7 blades, straight
- Construction: 6 elements in 5 groups

Features
- Ultrasonic motor: No No
- Lens-based stabilization: No No
- Macro capable: No No

Physical
- Max. length: 46 mm
- Diameter: 65.5 mm
- Weight: 182 g
- Filter diameter: 49 mm

History
- Introduction: 1985

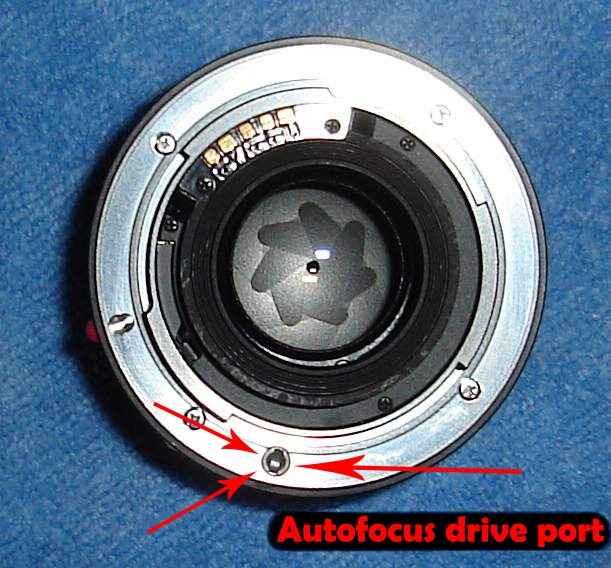
Rear view of Minolta AF lens showing the port for the external autofocus drive

The Minolta AF 50mm f/1.7 is a discontinued lens with autofocus that was produced by Minolta for A-mount single lens reflex cameras from 1985 through 2006. It is still in use today by users of digital and film SLRs from Minolta (later Konica-Minolta) and Sony. The relatively large maximum aperture (f/1.7) allows the photographer to take shots indoors even when operating at ISO 100 - 200.

== History ==
The 50 mm f/1.7 is one of the original 12 Minolta autofocus lenses introduced with the Maxxum / Dynax 7000 in 1985. Early versions sold in the United States under the Maxxum brand used a logo that featured crossed "X" letters; these were discontinued and replaced with a more conventional logo after Exxon filed a copyright infringement lawsuit against Minolta. This relatively fast normal lens uses a typical double Gauss design.

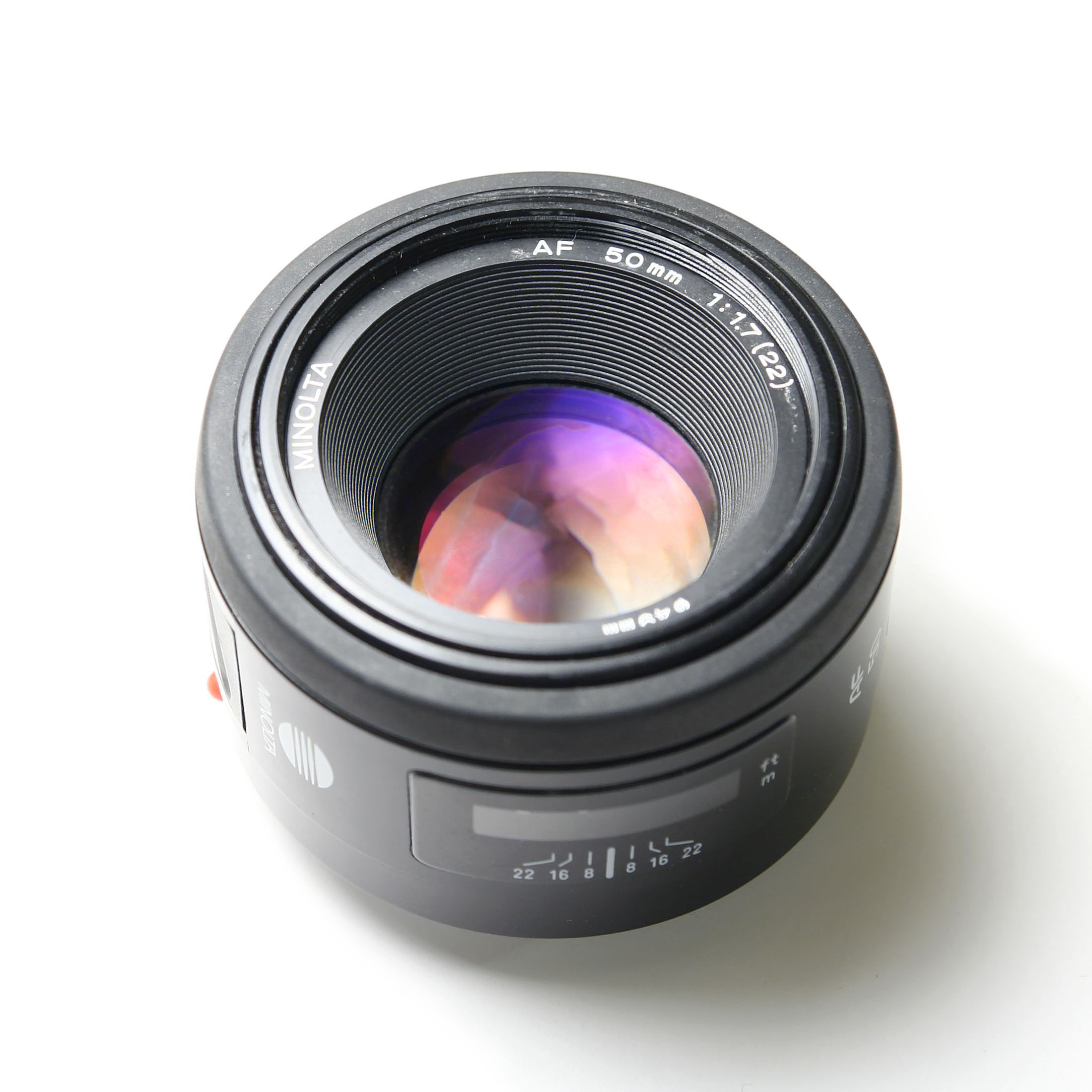
"Restyled" variant (after 1990), with rubber focus ring

The lens received cosmetic updates in the early 1990s, which can be identified by the rubber-coated focus ring, but the optical design remained unchanged. Unlike many other Minolta lenses that remained in production through the late 1990s, this lens never was updated with an encoder to report focusing distance to the camera body for the Advance Distance Integration (ADI) flash exposure system.

Minolta merged with Konica to form Konica Minolta in 2004, and the restyled lens remained in production until the Konica Minolta camera division was acquired by Sony in 2006. Sony did not re-release the 50 mm f/1.7 as a Sony A-mount lens, releasing a similar 50 mm f/1.8 lens (SAL-50F18) for APS-C sensor DLRs instead in 2009.

Minolta / Konica Minolta AF 50 mm f/1.7
Lens Spec		Minolta AF 50 mm f/1.7	Minolta AF 50 mm f/1.7 (restyled)
Model no.			
Year		1985	1990
Focal length		50 mm	
Aperture		f/1.7–22, 7-blade	
Const.	Ele.	6	
Const.	Grp.	5	
ADI		No	
Focus	Min.	0.5 m (1.5 ft)	
Focus	Limiter	No	
Focus	AF stop	No	
Dims.	Dia.	67 mm (2 5/8 in)	
Dims.	Len.	40 mm (1 9/16 in)	
Dims.	Wgt.	170 g (6 oz)	
Dims.	Filter (mm)	49	
Refs.			

== See also ==
- List of Minolta A-mount lenses
