= Minolta AF Macro 100mm f/2.8 =

Minolta SLR A-mount prime lens

Minolta AF Macro 100 mm f/2.8
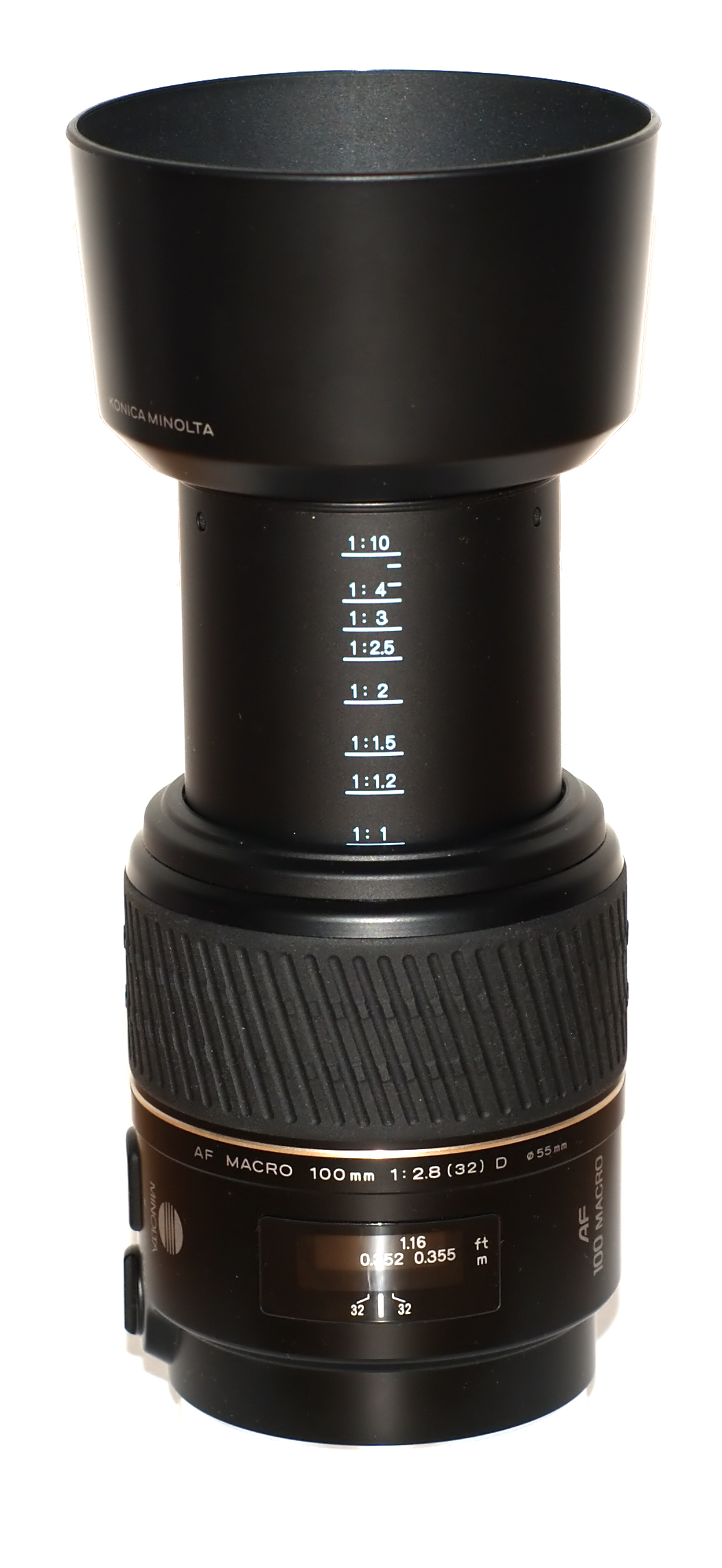
- Minolta AF Macro 100 mm f/2.8 D lens (third version), with hood, focused to closest distance
- Maker: Minolta, Sony
- Lens mount(s): Minolta / Sony A-mount
- Part number: SAL-100M28

Technical data
- Type: Prime
- Focus drive: screwdrive
- Focal length: 100 mm
- Image format: 135 film (24×36mm)
- Aperture (max/min): f/2.8–32
- Close focus distance: 0.352 m (1.2 ft)
- Max. magnification: 1:1
- Diaphragm blades: 9 blades
- Construction: 8 elements in 8 groups

Features
- Manual focus override: no
- Ultrasonic motor: no
- Weather-sealing: no
- Lens-based stabilization: no
- Application: Macro, portrait

Physical
- Min. length: 98 mm (3 7/8 in)
- Diameter: 71 mm (2 13/16 in)
- Weight: 519 g (18 5/16 oz)
- Filter diameter: 55 mm

Accessories
- Lens hood: Lens hood
- Case: Lens case or pouch

Angle of view
- Diagonal: 24°

History
- Introduction: 1986
- Discontinuation: 2022

Retail info
- MSRP: 799 USD (as of 2021)

The Minolta AF Macro 100 mm f/2.8 lens is a discontinued macro lens produced by Minolta that was renowned for its sharpness all the while garnering raving reviews also. This lens achieves a true 1:1 magnification of the subject matter of interest to the photographer. While still having an aperture of f/2.8 coupled with its focal length of 100 mm, it is considered a double duty lens for macro photography and portraiture/portrait photography.

== Design and history ==
There are four versions of the lens, all featuring identical optical designs:

Minolta / Konica Minolta / Sony AF Macro 100 mm f/2.8
Lens Spec		Minolta AF Macro 100 mm f/2.8	Minolta AF Macro 100 mm f/2.8 (restyled)	Minolta AF Macro 100 mm f/2.8 D	Sony AF Macro 100 mm f/2.8
Model no.					SAL-100M28
Year		1986	1993	2000	2006
Focal length		100 mm			
Aperture		f/2.8–32, 9-blade			
Const.	Ele.	8			
Const.	Grp.	8			
ADI		No		Yes	
Focus	Min.	0.352 m (1.2 ft)			
Focus	Limiter	Yes			
Focus	AF stop	No	Yes		
Dims.	Dia.	71 mm (2 13/16 in)		75 mm (2 15/16 in)	
Dims.	Len.	98 mm (3 7/8 in)			
Dims.	Wgt.	519 g (18 5/16 oz)		510 g (18 oz)	505 g (17.8 oz)
Dims.	Filter (mm)	55			
Refs.					

The first version (1986) shares the same design language with other first-generation Minolta AF lenses, featuring a smooth black plastic outer body shell and narrow ribbed manual focus ring at the front of the lens with engraved blue magnification ratio markings. In addition, the lens includes a rotary focusing range limiter switch for the photographer's left hand. The second version (1993) adds a focus lock button but otherwise primarily updates the cosmetics, retaining the front position for the manual focusing ring and adding a rubber coating.

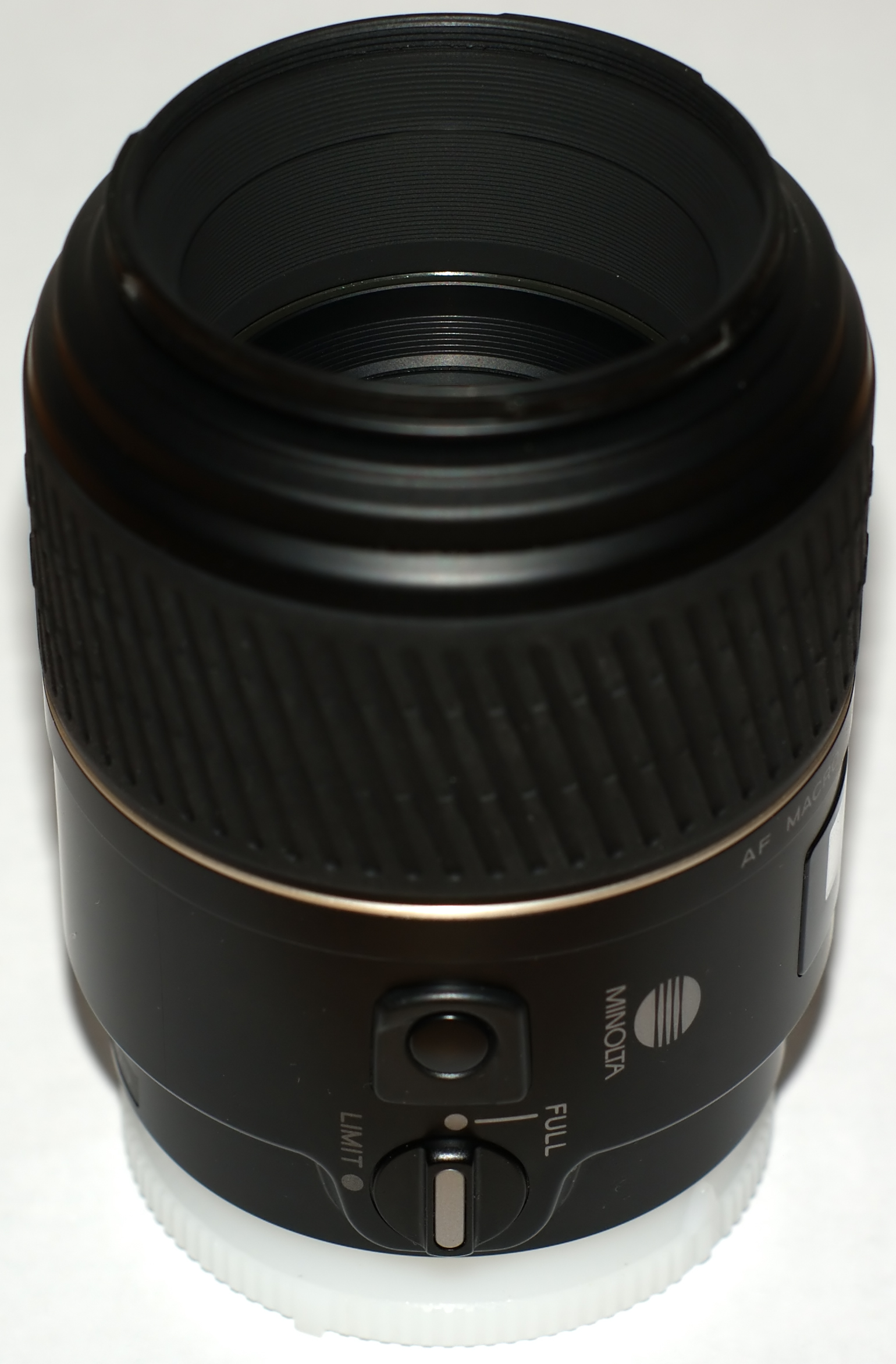
Third version (D), showing AF stop button and range limiter switch

The third version (2000) was given a much larger focusing ring and updated to pass focusing distance information to the camera body to work in conjunction with Minolta's flash metering system called Advanced Distance Integration (ADI); it is equipped with an 8-pin interface on the bayonet lens mount. These versions of the lens are compatible with D series flash units and select Maxxum camera bodies for the ADI system. ADI flash distance metering and execution of the ADI flash units allows for a more balanced lighting of the subject matter, thereby allowing the Minolta AF 100 mm to perform admirably well in a situation needing a flash.

The third version was rebranded and offered by Sony starting from 2006, after it acquired the photographic assets of Konica Minolta, until the Sony α line of single-lens reflex cameras and lenses was discontinued in 2022. The lenses produced by Sony after 2006 are based on the Minolta AF Macro 100 mm lens (2000), all the while being identical with the exception of their respective company's markings and corporate styles.

== See also ==
- List of Minolta A-mount lenses
