= Minolta AF Apo Tele Zoom 70-200mm f/2.8 G (D) SSM =

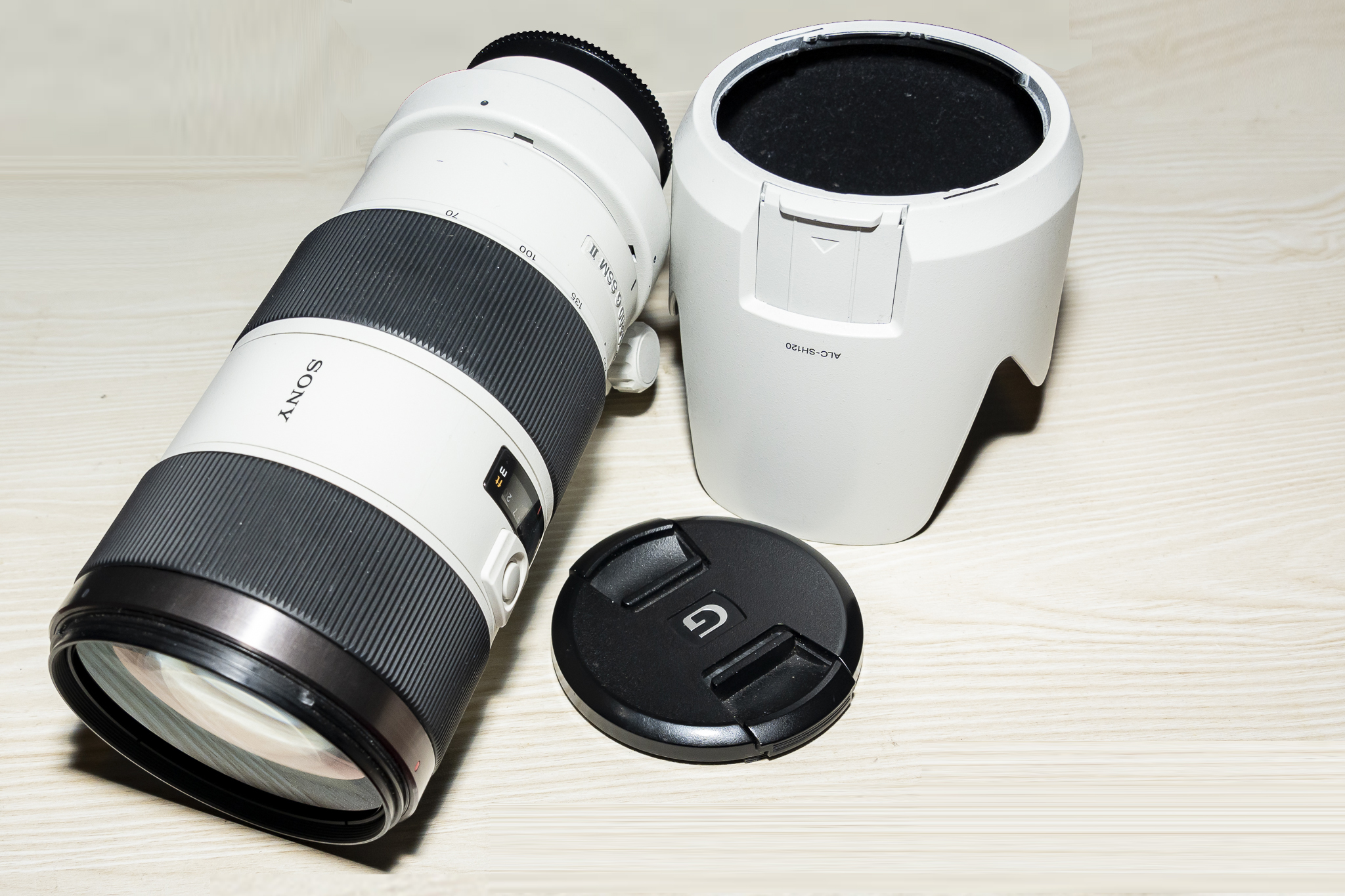
Sony A 70-200mm f/2.8 G SSM II

Originally developed and produced by Minolta as AF Apo Tele Zoom 70-200mm f/2.8 G (D) SSM, then marketed by Sony as 70-200mm f/2.8 G SSM (SAL-70200G) and updated as 70-200mm f/2.8 G SSM II (SAL-70200G2), this lens is a professional full-frame lens compatible with cameras using the Minolta, Konica Minolta and Sony A-mount.

== See also ==
- List of Minolta A-mount lenses

== Sources ==
- Dyxum lens data
