= Minolta AF Macro 50mm f/2.8 =

Minolta AF Macro 50 mm f/2.8
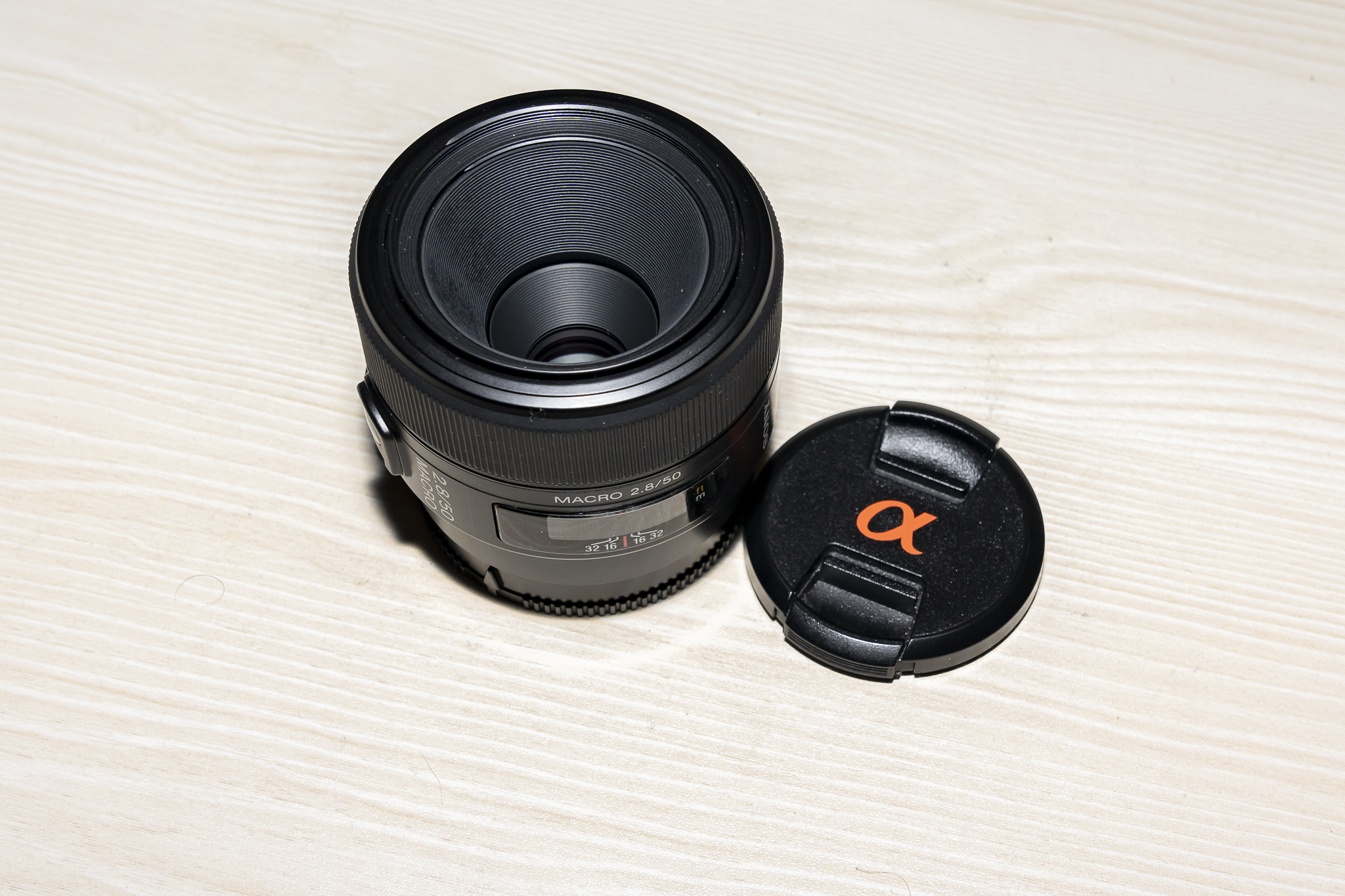
- Sony AF Macro 50 mm f/2.8 lens (third version)
- Maker: Minolta, Sony
- Lens mount: Minolta / Sony A-mount
- Part number: SAL-50M28

Technical data
- Type: Prime
- Focus drive: screwdrive
- Focal length: 50 mm
- Image format: 135 film (24×36mm)
- Aperture (max/min): f/2.8–32
- Close focus distance: 0.2 m (0.65 ft)
- Max. magnification: 1:1
- Diaphragm blades: 7 blades
- Construction: 7 elements in 6 groups

Features
- Manual focus override: no
- Ultrasonic motor: no
- Weather-sealing: no
- Lens-based stabilization: no
- Application: Macro

Physical
- Min. length: 59 mm (2 5/16 in)
- Diameter: 68 mm (2 11/16 in)
- Weight: 292 g (10 5/16 oz)
- Filter diameter: 55 mm

Accessories
- Lens hood: Lens hood
- Case: Lens case or pouch

Angle of view
- Diagonal: 47°

History
- Introduction: 1985
- Discontinuation: 2022

Retail info
- MSRP: 599 USD (as of 2015)

Originally produced by Minolta, and later produced by Sony, the AF Macro 50mm f/2.8 is a macro prime photographic lens compatible with cameras using the Minolta A-mount and Sony A-mount lens mounts.

== History and design ==
The 50mm f/2.8 was one of the lenses introduced with the Maxxum 7000 in 1985. It later was updated in a second version with an identical optical design and restyled cosmetics, which added a focus hold button. A third version was released in 2001 with a larger rubber focus ring and an 8-pin electronic interface for use with "D" series flashes and bodies; this was subsequently adopted and re-released by Sony after it acquired the camera division of Konica Minolta in 2006.

Minolta / Konica Minolta / Sony AF Macro 50 mm f/2.8
Lens Spec		Minolta AF Macro 50 mm f/2.8	Minolta AF Macro 50 mm f/2.8 (restyled)	Minolta AF Macro 50 mm f/2.8 D	Sony AF Macro 50 mm f/2.8
Model no.					SAL-50M28
Year		1985	1993	2001	2006
Focal length		50 mm			
Aperture		f/2.8–32, 7-blade			
Const.	Ele.	7			
Const.	Grp.	6			
ADI		No		Yes	
Focus	Min.	0.65 ft (0.2 m)			0.66 ft (0.2 m)
Focus	Limiter	Yes			
Focus	AF stop	No	Yes		
Dims.	Dia.	68 mm (2 11/16 in)	70 mm (2 3/4 in)	71 mm (2 13/16 in)	
Dims.	Len.	59 mm (2 5/16 in)	60 mm (2 3/8 in)		
Dims.	Wgt.	292 g (10 5/16 oz)	324 g (11 7/16 oz)	290 g (10 3/8 oz)	290 g (10.4 oz)
Dims.	Filter (mm)	55			
Refs.					

Embodiment 1 of JPS59228220A (Tokumaru, 1983)

The optical design for the 50mm f/2.8 macro lens was credited to Sho Tokumaru, featuring a "double floating" element design, which incorporated zoom lens technology to move three groups independently at slightly different rates during focusing to improve lens performance over a wide range of focusing distances.

== See also ==
- List of Minolta A-mount lenses
- list of other A-mount lenses
