= Minolta AF 20mm f/2.8 =

Minolta and Sony SLR A-mount prime lens

- Maker: Minolta, Sony

Technical data
- Type: Prime
- Focal length: 20mm
- Aperture (max/min): f/2.8 - f/22
- Close focus distance: 250 mm
- Max. magnification: 1/7.7
- Diaphragm blades: 7 circular
- Construction: 10 elements in 9 groups

Features
- Application: Normal wide-aperture prime

Physical
- Max. length: 53 mm
- Diameter: 72 mm
- Weight: 285 g

Accessories
- Lens hood: bayonet, flower

History
- Introduction: 2006 Sony

Retail info
- MSRP: 679 USD

Originally produced by Minolta, and currently produced by Sony, the 20mm f/2.8 is compatible with cameras using the Minolta AF and Sony α lens mounts.

== See also ==
- List of Minolta A-mount lenses

== Sources ==
- Dyxum lens data
