= Minolta AF Zoom 75-300mm f/4.5-5.6 =

Sony AF 75-300mm f/4.5-5.6
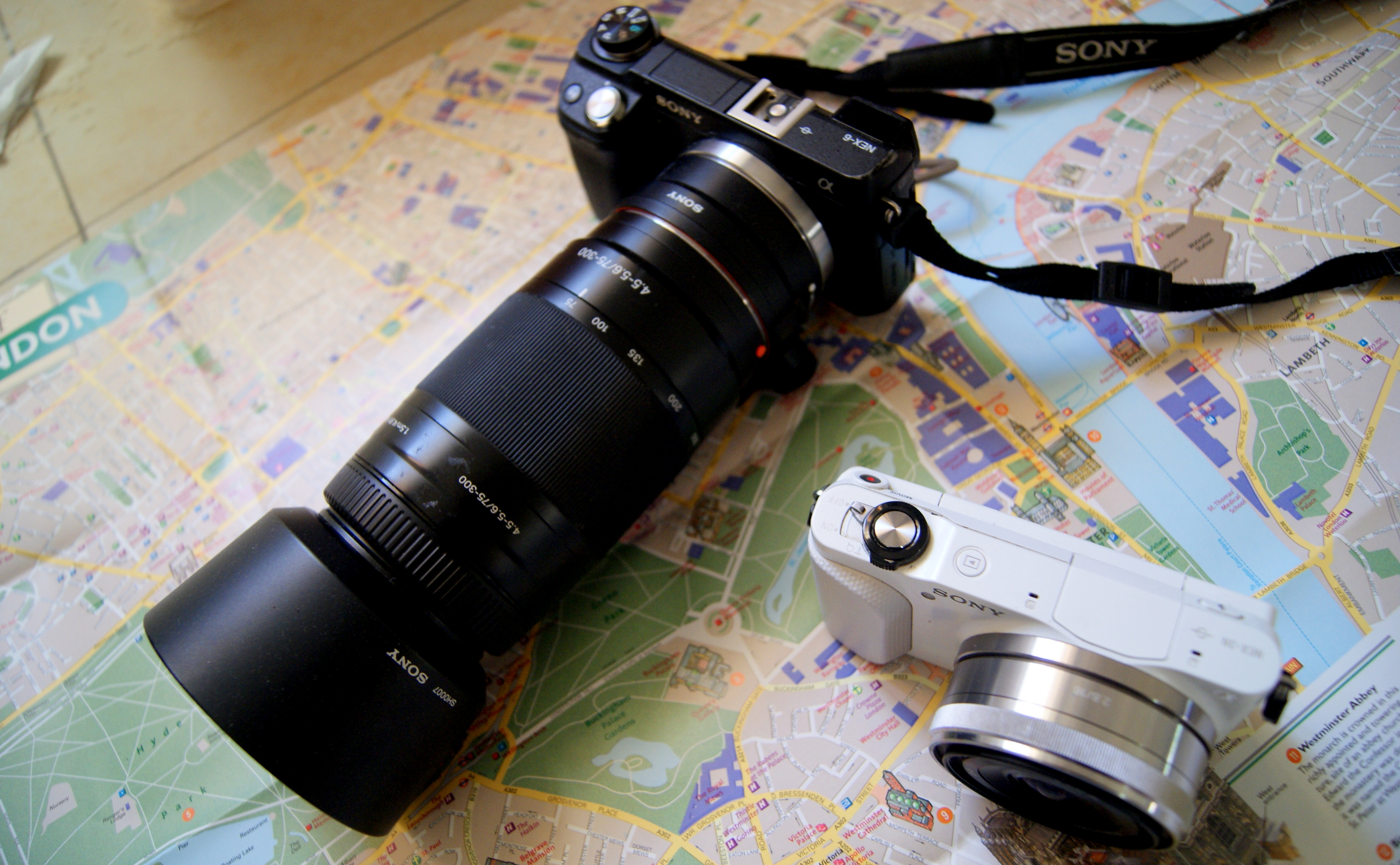
- Sony SAL-75300 lens (black, attached to NEX-6 camera on left via Sony LA-EA1 adapter)
- Maker: Sony

Technical data
- Type: Zoom
- Focal length: 75-300mm
- Crop factor: 32.1°-8.2°
- Aperture (max/min): f/4.5 - f/32
- Close focus distance: 1500 mm
- Max. magnification: 1/4
- Diaphragm blades: 7 circular
- Construction: 13 elements in 10 groups

Features
- Ultrasonic motor: no
- Lens-based stabilization: no
- Application: telephoto zoom lens

Physical
- Weight: 460 g
- Filter diameter: 55 mm

Accessories
- Lens hood: bayonet, round

Angle of view
- Horizontal: 32.1°-8.2°

History
- Introduction: 2006

Retail info
- MSRP: 229.95 USD

Originally produced by Minolta, and currently produced by Sony, the AF 75-300mm F4.5-5.6, is a telephoto zoom photographic lens compatible with cameras using the Minolta AF and Sony α lens mounts.

== History ==
=== First generation ===
The first generation body is made of metal. It was launched alongside the Minolta Maxxum 9000 in fall 1985. There is a focus limiter switch to speed up focusing. This lens and the Minolta AF 70-210mm f/4 lens are colloquially known as the "big beercan" and "beercan", respectively, by Minolta camera users because their shape and size closely match the proportions of a typical aluminum drink can used for beer.

=== Second to third generation ===
The optical construction is changed and the metal body is replaced by a plastic body. Consequently, the lens is much shorter and lighter.

The second generation has a focus hold button. Starting from the third generation, this lens is produced in black or silver color.

=== Fourth generation ===
The new (D) type supports ADI (Advanced Distance Integration) flash metering function.

=== Fifth generation ===
After Sony purchased the Minolta Camera Division, this lens was re-released under the Sony brand. The Sony lens retains most of the Minolta design but comes with a new look.

Minolta / Sony 75-300 mm zoom lenses
Model Spec		AF 75–300 mm f/4.5–5.6	AF 75–300 mm f/4.5–5.6 (New)	AF 75–300 mm f/4.5–5.6 II	AF 75–300 mm f/4.5–5.6 (D)	AF 75–300 mm f/4.5–5.6 (SAL-75300)
Released		1985	?	?	?	2006
Aperture		f/4.5–5.6				
Construction	Elements	13				
Construction	Groups	11	10			
Min. focus		1.5 m (4 ft 11 in)				
Dimensions	Φ×L	74×163 mm (2.9×6.4 in)	71×122 mm (2.8×4.8 in)			
Dimensions	Wgt.	880 g (31 oz)	520 g (18 1/2 oz)	490 g (17 1/4 oz)	460 g (16 oz)	
Dimensions	Filter (mm)	55				

== See also ==
- List of Minolta A-mount lenses
- List of Sony A-mount lenses
