= Minolta AL-F =

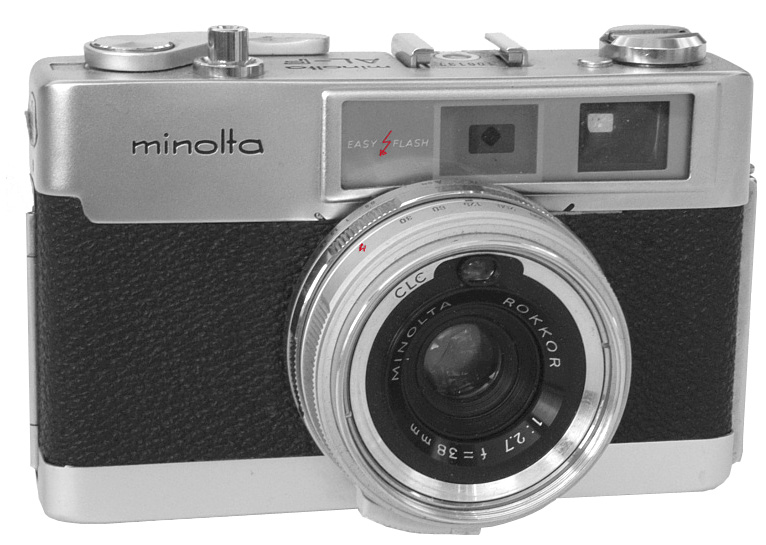

Overview
- Type: 35mm rangefinder camera

Lens
- Lens mount: fixed

Focusing
- Focus: manual

Exposure/metering
- Exposure: manual

The Minolta AL-F was a rangefinder camera launched by Minolta in 1967.

The AL-F was an automatic 35 mm camera. The series featured "pre-selection shutter speeds...fully automatic and/or full manual control operation...MINTOLA's unique automatic contrast light control exposuremeters..., coupled rangefinder with parallax compensation and superior hi-fi ROKKOR lenses" and an automatic flash system. In a 1970 Mintola newspaper ad, the camera was advertised for $76.50 and notes it is "much less with trade-in."

The camera had an automatic mode for flash photography ("Easy Flash"). Therefore, it had a guide number selector. A hot shoe for the flash gave further ease of flash usage. For manual exposure selection it offered shutter priority mode with preselection of five exposure times from 1/30 sec to 1/500 sec. The frame viewfinder was coupled to a superimposed rangefinder and had a mechanical horizontal parallax correction. For vertical parallax only a parallax arrow. The CdS exposure meter's aperture value proposal for the automatic aperture was visible through the finder, at the right side of the viewfinder image. The lens, a Rokkor 1:2,7/38mm, had only 4 elements in three groups, and a Seiko shutter. The meter's "eye" was placed within the filter ring of the lens.
