= Minolta mount =

Minolta mount may refer to:

- Minolta SR-mount (a.k.a. "MC"/"MD"), a 35mm manual-focus SLR lens mount between 1958 and 2001
- Minolta R-mount for Leica R-compatible Minolta lenses
- Minolta M-mount, a 35mm Leica M-compatible rangefinder lens mount between 1973 and 1985
- Minolta A-mount, a 35mm auto-focus SLR lens mount since 1985
- Minolta V-mount, an APS auto-focus SLR lens mount between 1996 and 1999
- Minolta L-mount for Leica M39×26tpi-compatible Minolta lenses
- Minolta Super A-mount, a 35mm rangefinder lens mount for Super Rokkor lenses
- Minolta LT-mount, a 35mm rangefinder lens mount only used on the Minolta A-2 LT by Chiyoda Kōgaku Seikō in 1958

== See also ==
- Konica Minolta A-mount
- Sony A-mount
