= Fujinon =

Brand of optical lenses

Fujinon (フジノン) is a brand of optical lenses made by Fuji Photo Film Co., Ltd, now known as Fujifilm. Fujifilm's Fujinon lenses have been used by professional photographers and broadcast stations as well as in cinematography. Originally established as a photographic material manufacturer, Fujifilm aimed to become a comprehensive photographic enterprise. In March 1940, the company began manufacturing optical glass at its factory in Odawara, Japan, which marked the start of the Fujinon brand. Although the initial goal was to produce lenses and cameras for consumer use, the outbreak of World War II forced the company to shift its focus entirely to military optical equipment. In April 1940, Fujifilm completed its first camera, an aerial camera for the Japanese Navy.

To meet the rapidly growing military demand, Fujifilm expanded its production capabilities by acquiring existing optical manufacturers. In March 1944, the company acquired Enomoto Kogaku Seiki Seisakusho (株式会社榎本光学精機製作所) (established in 1934), which primarily manufactured binoculars, and renamed it Fuji Photo Optical Co., Ltd. (富士写真光機株式会社). While post-war conditions led to the dissolution or sale of several other acquired companies and facilities, Fuji Photo Optical survived. They were proud of their use of expensive platinum crucibles to get the purest glass achievable at the time. In 2004, Fuji Photo Optical Co., Ltd. changed its name to Fujinon Corporation (フジノン株式会社), adopting its brand name, before being integrated into Fujifilm in 2010.

Fujifilm also pioneered Electron Beam Coating (EBC) which, according to Fujifilm, represented a new high in lens precision and performance. The EBC process was significantly different from other coating processes in the number of coatings, the thinness of the coating, and the materials used. Fujifilm claimed they were able to apply as many as 14 layers of coating and used materials such as zirconium oxide and cerium fluoride, which could not be used in conventional coating processes.[1] The first lens to offer Electron Beam Coating was the EBC Fujinon 55mm F3.5 Macro in 1972. Light transmission for the coating was said to be 99.8%. EBC later evolved into Super-EBC and HT-EBC (High Transmittance-Electron Beam Coating).

== 35mm format lenses ==
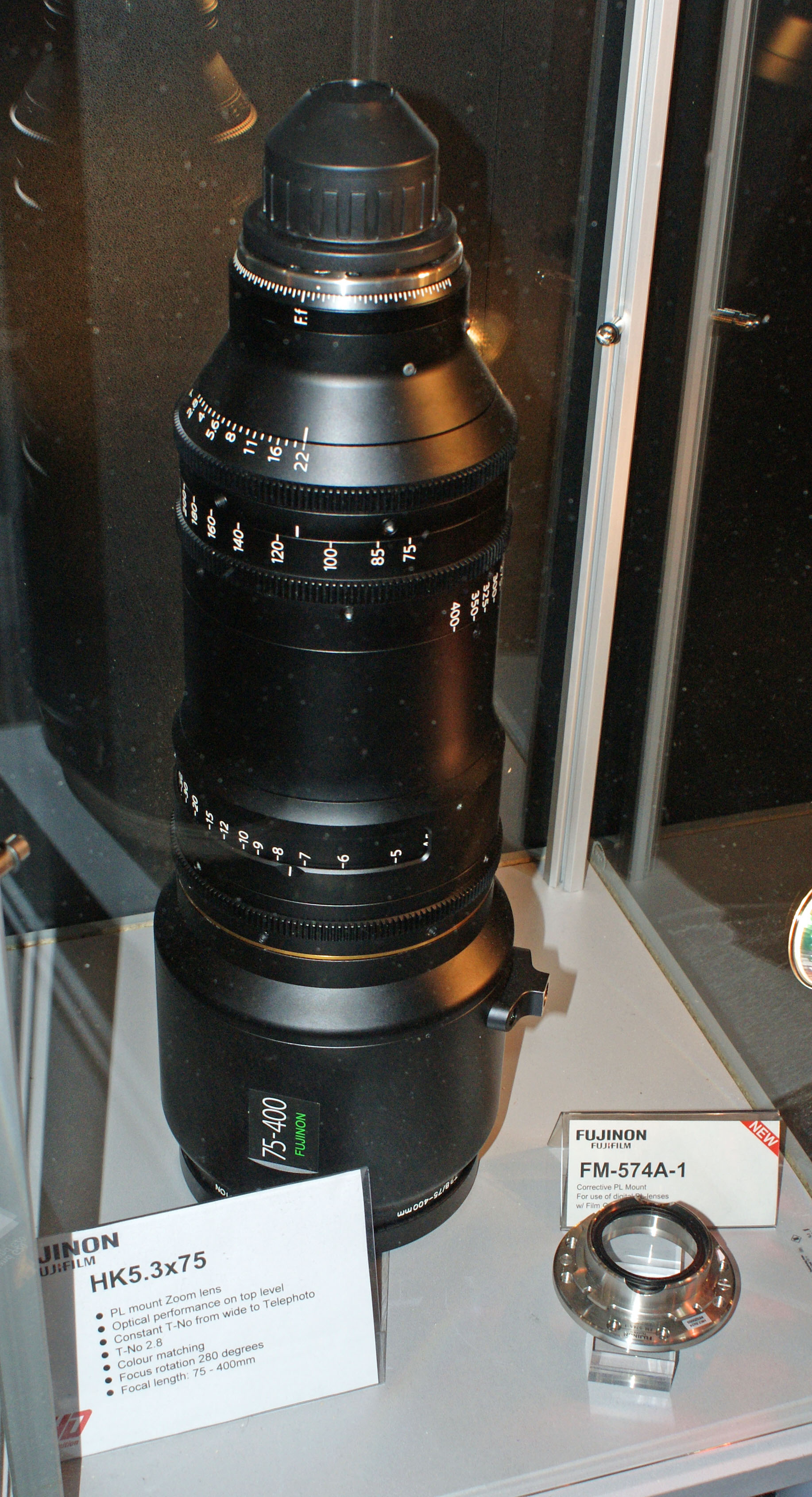
Fujinon HK5.3X75 35mm PL mount zoom lens, focal length 75-400 mm.

=== Fixed-lens cameras ===
Fujinon and Fujinar lenses for fixed-lens full-frame 35mm cameras
Name	Img	FL (mm)	Ap	Const. (grp/ele)	Angle	Min. focus	Camera(s)	Filter (mm)	Notes & refs.
Fujinon 35mm f/2.8		35	f/2.8–?	3/4	63°	?	35FS, 35GP	49	
Fujinon·Z 37~55mm f/3.8		37~55	f/3.8–?	8/8	43–61°	?	Flash Zoom Date	58	
Fujinon 38mm f/2.5		38	f/2.5–22	4/5	59°	?	35S	30.5	
Fujinon 38mm f/2.8		38	f/2.8–?	4/5	59°	?	Compact 35	30.5	
Fujinon 38mm f/2.8		38	f/2.8–?	4/4	59°	?	Flash, Flash II, Flash AF, Auto·5, Auto·7, DL-100	46	
Fujinon 38mm f/2.8		38	f/2.8–?	3/4	59°	?	GE, GER, GA, MP, Date, HD-1, HD-S	46 (67)	
Fujinon 38mm f/3.4		38	f/3.4–?	3/3	59°	?	35 Automagic	?	
Fujinon 38mm f/4		38	f/4–?	3/3	59°	?	DL-20	—N/a	
Fujinon 40mm f/2.8		40	f/2.8–22	3/4	57°	1 m (3.3 ft)	ST-F	49	
Fujinon 40mm f/8		40	f/8	3/3	57°	fixed	PicPAL	—N/a	
Fujinon 45mm f/1.8		45	f/1.8–22	4/6	51°	0.91 m (3 ft)	V2, Compact D, Compact Deluxe	52	
Fujinon 45mm f/1.9		45	f/1.9–?	4/6	51°	?	35SE, 35EE	35.5	
Fujinon 45mm f/2		45	f/2.0–?	?	51°	?	35ML	35.5	
Fujinon 45mm f/2.8		45	f/2.8–?	4/5	51°	?	35M, 35ML, 35SE	35.5	
Fujinar-K 45mm f/3.5		45	f/3.5–22	?	51°	0.8 m (2.6 ft)	Fujipet 35	?	
Fujinon 47mm f/2.8		47	f/2.8–16	3/4	49°	0.8 m (2.6 ft)	35 Auto-M	35.5	

Fujinon and Fujinar lenses for fixed-lens half-frame 35mm cameras
Name	Img	FL (mm)	Ap	Const. (grp/ele)	Angle	Min. focus	Camera(s)	Filter (mm)	Notes & refs.
Fujinon / Fujinar-K 28mm f/2.8		28	f/2.8–22	4/5	56°	1 m (3.3 ft)	Half, Drive, Mini	22.5	
Fujinon 33mm f/1.9		33	f/1.9–22	?	49°	0.9 m (3.0 ft)	Half 1.9	?	

=== M42 system cameras ===
Fuji Photo Film manufactured and sold nine distinct 135 film camera models with the M42 lens mount between 1970 and 1978, including cameras aimed at the entry-level user (ST-601, 605), enthusiast (ST-701, 801), and professional (ST-901, AZ-1) markets.

Fujinon lenses for M42 cameras
Name	Img	FL (mm)	Ap	Const. (grp/ele)	Angle	Min. focus	Dims. (Φ×L)	Wgt.	Filter (mm)	Notes & refs.
Ultra wide and fisheye lenses
EBC Fujinon·F 16mm f/2.8		16	f/2.8–16	7/11 (Note: At least one source says 8/12, implying the filter is counted in the optical formula.)	180°	0.2 m (0.7 ft)	61.4×55.6 mm (2 5/12×2 3/16 in)	384 g (13.54 oz)	(built-in)	Full-frame fisheye
EBC Fujinon·SW 19mm f/3.5		19	f/3.5–22	8/11	95°55'	0.3 m (1.0 ft)	69.9×49.2 mm (2 3/4×1 15/16 in)	262 g (9.24 oz)	77	
Wide-angle lenses
EBC Fujinon·W 24mm f/2.8		24	f/2.8–16	8/9	84°	0.25 m (0.8 ft)	59.3×42.9 mm (2 1/3×1 11/16 in)	173 g (6.10 oz)	49	
EBC Fujinon·W 28mm f/3.5		28	f/3.5–16	5/5	74°	0.4 m (1.3 ft)	61.4×38.1 mm (2 5/12×1 1/2 in)	155 g (5.47 oz)	49	
Fujinon·SW 28mm f/3.5		28	f/3.5–16	7/7	75°	0.4 m (1.3 ft)	?	155 g (5.47 oz)	49	
EBC Fujinon·W 35mm f/1.9		35	f/1.9–16	6/8	62°44'	0.4 m (1.3 ft)	61.4×49.2 mm (2 5/12×1 15/16 in)	228 g (8.05 oz)	49	
EBC Fujinon·W 35mm f/2.8		35	f/2.8–16	6/7	62°36'	0.4 m (1.3 ft)	61.4×44.5 mm (2 5/12×1 3/4 in)	190 g (6.70 oz)	49	
Fujinon·W 35mm f/2.8		35	f/2.8–16	6/7	62°36'	0.4 m (1.3 ft)	?	190 g (6.70 oz)	49	
Fujinon·W 35mm f/3.5		35	f/3.5–16	4/4	63°24'	0.4 m (1.3 ft)	?	140 g (4.9 oz)	49	
Normal lenses
Fujinon·Z 43–75mm f/3.5~4.5		43–75	f/3.5~4.5–22	7/7	53°30'–32°6'	1.2 m (3.9 ft)	63.5×92.1 mm (2 1/2×3 5/8 in)	298 g (10.50 oz)	49	
EBC Fujinon 45mm f/2.8		45	f/2.8–16	4/5	51°	0.8 m (2.6 ft)	?	90 g (3.2 oz)	49	
EBC Fujinon 50mm f/1.4		50	f/1.4–16	6/7	45°22'	0.45 m (1.5 ft)	63.5×42.9 mm (2 1/2×1 11/16 in)	285 g (10.05 oz)	49	
Fujinon 50mm f/1.4		50	f/1.4–16	6/7	45°22'	0.45 m (1.5 ft)	?	245 g (8.6 oz)	49	
EBC Fujinon·Z 54–270mm f/4.5		54–270	f/4.5–22	12/15	43°43'–9°11'	2.5 m (8.2 ft)	88.9×219.1 mm (3 1/2×8 5/8 in)	1,340 g (47.26 oz)	82	
EBC Fujinon 55mm f/1.8		55	f/1.8–16	4/6	42°10'	0.45 m (1.5 ft)	61.4×42.9 mm (2 5/12×1 11/16 in)	195 g (6.88 oz)	49	
Fujinon 55mm f/1.8		55	f/1.8–16	4/6	42°10'	0.45 m (1.5 ft)	?	195 g (6.88 oz)	49	
Fujinon 55mm f/2.2		55	f/2.2–16	4/4	42°10'	0.6 m (2.0 ft)	?	144 g (5.1 oz)	49	
EBC Fujinon·M 55mm f/3.5		55	f/3.5–32	4/5	42°45'	0.22 m (0.7 ft)	63.5×26.2 mm (2 1/2×1 1/32 in)	250 g (8.82 oz)	49	Macro
Portrait lenses
EBC Fujinon·Z 75–150mm f/4.5		75–150	f/4.5–22	9/12	32°16'–16°23'	1.8 m (5.9 ft)	73.0×142.9 mm (2 7/8×5 5/8 in)	730 g (25.75 oz)	62	
EBC Fujinon·SF 85mm f/4		85	f/4–16	4/4	28°34'	1.0 m (3.3 ft)	63.5×66.7 mm (2 1/2×2 5/8 in)	285 g (10.05 oz)	49	Soft focus
EBC Fujinon·T 100mm f/2.8		100	f/2.8–22	4/5	24°24'	1.2 m (3.9 ft)	63.5×60.3 mm (2 1/2×2 3/8 in)	240 g (8.46 oz)	49	
Fujinon·T 100mm f/2.8		100	f/2.8–22	4/5	24°24'	1.2 m (3.9 ft)	?	240 g (8.46 oz)	49	
EBC Fujinon·T 135mm f/2.5		135	f/2.5–22	4/5	18°09'	1.5 m (4.9 ft)	66.7×79.4 mm (2 5/8×3 1/8 in)	429 g (15.12 oz)	58	
EBC Fujinon·T 135mm f/3.5		135	f/3.5–22	4/5	18°13'	1.5 m (4.9 ft)	58.7×79.4 mm (2 5/16×3 1/8 in)	285 g (10.05 oz)	49	
Fujinon·T 135mm f/3.5		135	f/3.5–22	4/4	18.2°	1.5 m (4.9 ft)	?	285 g (10.05 oz)	49	
Telephoto lenses
EBC Fujinon·T 200mm f/4.5		200	f/4.5–22	5/5	12°20'	2.5 m (8.2 ft)	63.5×133.4 mm (2 1/2×5 1/4 in)	475 g (16.75 oz)	49	
Fujinon·T 200mm f/4.5		200	f/4.5–22	5/5	12°20'	2.5 m (8.2 ft)	?	475 g (16.75 oz)	49	
EBC Fujinon·T 400mm f/4.5		400	f/4.5–45	4/5	6°11'	8 m (26 ft)	101.6×290.5 mm (4×11 7/16 in)	1,935 g (68.25 oz)	49	Manual diaphragm
EBC Fujinon·T 600mm f/5.6		600	f/5.6–45	4/5	4°7'	12.5 m (41 ft)	120.7×439.7 mm (4 3/4×17 5/16 in)	3,050 g (107.57 oz)	49	Manual diaphragm
Fujinon·T 1000mm f/8		1000	f/8–45	5/5	2.5°	30 m (98 ft)	?	5,200 g (183.4 oz)	49	Manual diaphragm

Fujinon M42 screw mount

- Fujinon 55mm F1.6
- Fujinon-Z 29-47mm F3.5-4.2
- EBC Fujinon-Z 75-205mm F3.8

=== Fujica X cameras ===
The Fujica AX-1, launched in 197x, introduced the Fujica X bayonet mount to replace the previous line of M42-mount SLRs. Many of the initial lenses for the Fujica X mount share optical designs with the late M42 Fujinon lenses.

X-Fujinon and X-Fujinar lenses for Fujica X-mount cameras
Name (Note: Lenses with a "DM" suffix have full exposure mode support with the AX-5, including program, shutter priority, aperture priority, and manual. Otherwise, lenses without the "DM" are limited to aperture priority and manual exposure modes with the AX-5 SLR; program and shutter priority exposure modes are not available.)	Img	FL (mm)	Ap	Const. (grp/ele)	Angle	Min. focus	Dims. (Φ×L)	Wgt.	Filter (mm)	Notes & refs.
Ultra wide and fisheye lenses
EBC X-Fujinon·F 16mm f/2.8 DM		16	f/2.8–16	8/12	180°	0.2 m (0.7 ft)	74×56 mm (2.9×2.2 in)	408 g (14.4 oz)	(built-in)	Full-frame fisheye
EBC X-Fujinon·SW 19mm f/3.5 DM		19	f/3.5–16	8/11	96°	0.25 m (0.8 ft)	75×51 mm (3.0×2.0 in)	265 g (9.3 oz)	72	
Wide-angle lenses
EBC X-Fujinon·W 24mm f/2.8 DM		24	f/2.8–16	8/9	84°	0.25 m (0.8 ft)	61.5×45.5 mm (2.4×1.8 in)	195 g (6.9 oz)	49	
EBC X-Fujinon·W 28mm f/1.9 DM		28	f/1.9–16	8/8	75°	0.3 m (1.0 ft)	62 mm (2.4 in)×?	280 g (9.9 oz)	49	
X-Fujinar·W 28mm f/2.8 DM		28	f/2.8–16	6/6	76°	0.35 m (1.1 ft)	62×43 mm (2.4×1.7 in)	195 g (6.9 oz)	49	
EBC X-Fujinon·W 28mm f/3.5 DM		28	f/3.5–16	5/5	74°	0.3 m (1.0 ft)	61.5×41.0 mm (2.4×1.6 in)	160 g (5.6 oz)	49	
X-Fujinon·Z 29–47mm f/3.5~4.2 DM		29–47	f/3.5~4.2–22	8/8	74–50°	0.6 m (2.0 ft)	64.5×52.0 mm (2.5×2.0 in)	285 g (10.1 oz)	55	
EBC X-Fujinon·W 35mm f/1.9 DM		35	f/1.9–16	6/8	63.5°	0.35 m (1.1 ft)	61.5×50 mm (2.4×2.0 in)	205 g (7.2 oz)	49	
EBC X-Fujinon·W 35mm f/2.8 DM		35	f/2.8–16	6/7	63°	0.35 m (1.1 ft)	61.5×46.0 mm (2.4×1.8 in)	190 g (6.7 oz)	49	
Normal lenses
EBC X-Fujinon·Z 35–70mm f/2.8~3.7 DM		35–70	f/2.8~3.7–22	7/7	62–35°	1.0 m (3.3 ft)	68×74 mm (2.7×2.9 in)	435 g (15.3 oz)	62	with Macro
X-Fujinon·Z 43–75mm f/3.5~4.5 DM		43–75	f/3.5~4.5–22	7/7	54–32°	1.2 m (3.9 ft)	64.0×62.5 mm (2.5×2.5 in)	310 g (11 oz)	49	
EBC X-Fujinon 50mm f/1.2 DM		50	f/1.2–16	7/7	45°	0.45 m (1.5 ft)	66×50 mm (2.6×2.0 in)	300 g (11 oz)	55	
X-Fujinon 50mm f/1.6 DM		50	f/1.6–16	6/6	48°	0.6 m (2.0 ft)	61.5×36.5 mm (2.4×1.4 in)	175 g (6.2 oz)	49	
EBC X-Fujinon 50mm f/1.6 DM		50	f/1.6–16	6/6	48°	0.6 m (2.0 ft)	61.5×36.5 mm (2.4×1.4 in)	175 g (6.2 oz)	49	
X-Fujinon 50mm f/1.9 DM		50	f/1.9–16	5/5	47°	0.6 m (2.0 ft)	62×37 mm (2.4×1.5 in)	150 g (5.3 oz)	49	
X-Fujinon 50mm f/1.9 FM		50	f/1.9–16	5/5	47°	0.6 m (2.0 ft)	62×37 mm (2.4×1.5 in)	150 g (5.3 oz)	49	
X-Fujinon 50mm f/2.2		50	f/2.2–16	4/4	43°	0.6 m (2.0 ft)	62×37 mm (2.4×1.5 in)	145 g (5.1 oz)	49	
X-Fujinon 55mm f/1.6 DM		55	f/1.6–16	4/5	43°	0.45 m (1.5 ft)	61.5×51.0 mm (2.4×2.0 in)	275 g (9.7 oz)	49	
EBC X-Fujinon 55mm f/1.6 DM		55	f/1.6–16	4/5	43°	0.45 m (1.5 ft)	61.5×51.0 mm (2.4×2.0 in)	275 g (9.7 oz)	49	
X-Fujinon 55mm f/2.2		55	f/2.2–16	4/4	43°	0.6 m (2.0 ft)	61.5×37.0 mm (2.4×1.5 in)	130 g (4.6 oz)	49	
EBC X-Fujinon·M 55mm f/3.5 DM		55	f/3.5–22	4/5	43°	0.24 m (0.8 ft)	61.5×53.5 mm (2.4×2.1 in)	202 g (7.1 oz)	49	Macro
Portrait lenses
EBC X-Fujinon·Z 70–140mm f/4~4.5 DM		70–140	f/4~4.5–22	9/10	33–19°	1.5 m (4.9 ft)	67×107 mm (2.6×4.2 in)	565 g (19.9 oz)	55	with Macro
EBC X-Fujinon·Z 75–150mm f/4.5 DM		75–150	f/4.5–22	9/12	33–16°	1.8 m (5.9 ft)	69.5×144.5 mm (2.7×5.7 in)	715 g (25.2 oz)	62	
X-Fujinar·Z 80–200mm f/3.8 DM		80–200	f/3.8–16	9/13	12.4–31°	2.0 m (6.6 ft)	67×142 mm (2.6×5.6 in)	585 g (20.6 oz)	55	
EBC X-Fujinon·Z 85–225mm f/4.5 DM		85–225	f/4.5–22	9/12	28–11°	1.6 m (5.2 ft)	71×155 mm (2.8×6.1 in)	720 g (25 oz)	55	
EBC X-Fujinon·T 100mm f/2.8 DM		100	f/2.8–22	4/5	24°	1.0 m (3.3 ft)	61.5×61.5 mm (2.4×2.4 in)	245 g (8.6 oz)	49	
EBC X-Fujinon·T 135mm f/2.5 DM		135	f/2.5–22	4/5	18°	1.5 m (4.9 ft)	67×83 mm (2.6×3.3 in)	425 g (15.0 oz)	58	
X-Fujinar·T 135mm f/2.8 DM		135	f/2.8–16	4/4	18°	1.5 m (4.9 ft)	64×85 mm (2.5×3.3 in)	440 g (16 oz)	55	
EBC X-Fujinon·T 135mm f/3.5 DM		135	f/3.5–22	4/4	18°	1.5 m (4.9 ft)	61.5×79.0 mm (2.4×3.1 in)	290 g (10 oz)	49	
Telephoto lenses
EBC X-Fujinon·T 200mm f/4.5 DM		200	f/4.5–22	5/5	12°	2.5 m (8.2 ft)	64.5×134.0 mm (2.5×5.3 in)	490 g (17 oz)	49	
EBC X-Fujinon·T 400mm f/4.5		400	f/4.5–45	4/5	6°	8 m (26 ft)	101.0×291.5 mm (4.0×11.5 in)	1,940 g (4.3 lb)	49	Manual diaphragm

=== TX-1 and TX-2 cameras ===
The Fujifilm TX-1 is a rangefinder which captures images in standard 24×36 mm format or panoramic 24×65 mm format on 135 film, introduced in 1998. Outside of Japan, it was marketed by Hasselblad as the XPan. It was succeeded by the TX-2 / XPan II in 2003.

The crop factor for the panoramic format (based on diagonal angle of view) compared to "full-frame" 135 is 0.62; for example, the 90 mm lens in panoramic mode would have the equivalent coverage across the diagonal of a lens with a focal length of approximately 55 mm on a standard 135 film camera.

Super EBC Fujinon TX interchangeable lenses for Fujifilm TX (Hasselblad XPan) cameras
FL (mm)	Apr.	Name	Construction		Angle (panorama)	Min. Focus	Dimensions			Notes
FL (mm)	Apr.	Name	Ele	Grp	Angle (panorama)	Min. Focus	Φ×L	Wgt.	Filter (mm)	Notes
Ultra wide angle lenses
30	f/5.6–22	5.6/30 mm Aspherical	10	8	72° (98°)	0.7 m (2 ft 4 in)	66.0×53.5 mm (2.6×2.1 in)	295 g (10.4 oz)	58	Complete kit includes lens, viewfinder, lens shade, and centre filter
Wide angle lenses
45	f/4–22	4/45 mm	8	6	51° (75°)	0.7 m (2 ft 4 in)	60.0×47.0 mm (2.4×1.9 in)	235 g (8.3 oz)	49	
Normal lenses
90	f/4–22	4/90 mm	9	7	27° (42°)	1.0 m (3 ft 3 in)	60.0×73.0 mm (2.4×2.9 in)	365 g (12.9 oz)	49	

== Fixed-lens cartridge cameras ==
Fuji Photo Film also made cameras compatible with a proprietary square format (Rapid) on 135 film in special cartridges, designed to compete with 126 film cameras such as the Kodak Instamatic, and 110 cartridge (Pocket) film cameras.

Fujinon and Fujinar lenses for fixed-lens Rapid and 110 cameras
Name	Img	FL (mm)	Ap	Const. (grp/ele)	Angle	Min. focus	Camera(s)	Filter (mm)	Notes & refs.
Fujinon / Fujinar-K 28mm f/2.8		28	f/2.8–22	?	62°	0.8 m (2.6 ft)	Rapid D1, S2	?	
40mm f/11		40	f/11	1/1	46°	fixed	Rapid S, SF	—N/a	

== Lenses for the digital Fujifilm X system ==
- Fujifilm XF Lenses

Lenses equipped with the Fujifilm X-mount, which has a crop factor of 1.53× due to its sensor size of 23.5×15.6 mm (0.9×0.6 in).

Fujinon XF and XC lenses for X system digital cameras
Name (Note: The following abbreviations are used: APD: Apodization element; LM: Linear Motor for autofocus; OIS: Optical image stabilization; PZ: Power (motor-operated) zoom controls; R: Aperture ring present; T/S: Mechanical adjustments for tilt and shift; WR: Weather resistant seals)	Img	FL (mm)	Equiv. FL (35mm)	Ap	Const. (grp/ele)	Angle	Min. focus	Dims. (Φ×L)	Wgt.	Filter (mm)	Notes & refs.
Ultra wide angle lenses
XF 8mm F3.5 R WR		8	12	f/3.5–22	9/12	121°	0.18 m (0.6 ft)	68.5×52.8 mm (2.7×2.1 in)	215 g (7.6 oz)	62	
XF 8-16mm F2.8 R LM WR		8–16	12–25	f/2.8–22	13/20	83–121°	0.25 m (0.8 ft)	88×121.5 mm (3.5×4.8 in)	805 g (28.4 oz)	—N/a	
XF 10-24mm F4 R OIS WR		10–24	15–37	f/4.0–22	10/14	61–109°	0.24 m (0.8 ft)	77.6×87 mm (3.1×3.4 in)	385 g (13.6 oz)	72	
XC 13-33mm F3.5-6.3 OIS		13–33	20–51	f/3.5~6.3–22	10/14	46–95°	0.2 m (0.7 ft)	61.9×55.6–57.2 mm (2.4×2.2–2.3 in)	125 g (4.4 oz)	49	
XF 14mm F2.8 R		14	21	f/2.8–22	7/10	90°	0.30 m (1.0 ft)	65×58.4 mm (2.6×2.3 in)	235 g (8.3 oz)	58	
Wide-angle lenses
XC 15-45mm F3.5-5.6 OIS PZ		15–45	23–69	f/3.5~5.6–22	9/10	35–86°	0.35 m (1.1 ft)	62.6×65.2–62.1 mm (2.5×2.6–2.4 in) (W/T)	135 g (4.8 oz)	52	
XF 16mm F1.4 R WR		16	25	f/1.4–16	11/13	83°	0.15 m (0.5 ft)	73.4×73.0 mm (2.9×2.9 in)	375 g (13.2 oz)	67	
XF 16mm F2.8 R WR		16	25	f/2.8–22	8/10	83°	0.17 m (0.6 ft)	60×45.4 mm (2.4×1.8 in)	155 g (5.5 oz)	49	
XF 16-50mm F2.8-4.8 R LM WR		16–50	25–77	f/2.8~4.8–22	9/11	32–83°	0.24 m (0.8 ft)	65×71.4 mm (2.6×2.8 in)	240 g (8.5 oz)	58	
XC 16-50mm F3.5-5.6 OIS		16–50	25–77	f/3.5~5.6–22	10/12	32–83°	0.35 m (1.1 ft)	62.6×65.2–98.3 mm (2.5×2.6–3.9 in)	195 g (6.9 oz)	58	
XC 16-50mm F3.5-5.6 OIS II		16–50	25–77	f/3.5~5.6–22	10/12	32–83°	0.35 m (1.1 ft)	62.6×65.2–98.3 mm (2.5×2.6–3.9 in)	195 g (6.9 oz)	58	
XF 16-55mm F2.8 R LM WR	<	16–55	25–84	f/2.8–22	12/17	29–83°	0.6 m (2.0 ft)	83.3×106.0–129.5 mm (3.3×4.2–5.1 in) (W/T)	655 g (23.1 oz)	77	
XF 16-55mm F2.8 R LM WR II		16–55	25–84	f/2.8–22	11/16	29–83°	0.3 m (1.0 ft)	78.3×95–122 mm (3.1×3.7–4.8 in) (W/T)	410 g (14.5 oz)	72	
XF 16-80mm F4 R OIS WR		16–80	25–123	f/4.0–22	12/16	20–83°	0.35 m (1.1 ft)	78.3×88.9–131.5 mm (3.1×3.5–5.2 in) (W/T)	440 g (15.5 oz)	72	
XF 18mm F1.4 R LM WR		18	28	f/1.4–16	9/15	76°	0.20 m (0.7 ft)	68.8×75.6 mm (2.7×3.0 in)	370 g (13.1 oz)	62	
XF 18mm F2 R		18	28	f/2.0–16	7/8	76°	0.80 m (2.6 ft)	64.5×33.7 mm (2.5×1.3 in)	116 g (4.1 oz)	52	
MKX 18-55mm T2.9		18–55	28–84	T2.9–22	17/22	29–76°	0.85 m (2.8 ft)	87×206.6 mm (3.4×8.1 in)	1,100 g (2.4 lb)	82	
XF 18-55mm F2.8-4 R LM OIS		18–55	28–84	f/2.8~4.0–22	10/14	29–76°	0.6 m (2.0 ft)	65.0×70.4–97.9 mm (2.6×2.8–3.9 in) (W/T)	310 g (10.9 oz)	58	
XF 18-120mm F4 LM PZ WR		18–120	28–184	f/4.0–22	12/15	13–76°	0.6 m (2.0 ft)	77.3×123.5 mm (3.0×4.9 in)	460 g (16.2 oz)	72	
XF 18-135mm F3.5-5.6 R LM OIS WR		18–135	28–207	f/3.5~5.6–22	12/16	12–76°	0.6 m (2.0 ft)	75.7×97.8–158 mm (3.0×3.9–6.2 in) (W/T)	490 g (17.3 oz)	67	
XF 23mm F1.4 R LM WR		23	35	f/1.4–16	10/15	63°	0.19 m (0.6 ft)	67×77.8 mm (2.6×3.1 in)	375 g (13.2 oz)	58	
XF 23mm F1.4 R		23	35	f/1.4–16	8/11	63°	0.6 m (2.0 ft)	72.0×63.0 mm (2.8×2.5 in)	300 g (10.6 oz)	62	
Aspherical 23mm F2		23	35	f/2.0–16	6/8 (1 asph.)	63°	0.10 m (0.3 ft)	—N/a	—N/a	?	fixed lens X100, S, T, & F
Aspherical 23mm F2 II		23	35	f/2.0–16	6/8 (2 asph.)	63°	0.10 m (0.3 ft)	—N/a	—N/a	?	redesigned fixed lens X100V, VI
XF 23mm F2 R WR		23	35	f/2.0–16	6/10	63°	0.22 m (0.7 ft)	60.0×51.9 mm (2.4×2.0 in)	180 g (6.3 oz)	43	
XF 23mm F2.8 R WR		23	35	f/2.8–16	6/8	63°	0.2 m (0.7 ft)	61.8×23 mm (2.4×0.9 in)	90 g (3.2 oz)	39	
Normal lenses
XF 27mm F2.8 R WR		27	41	f/2.8–16	5/7	55°	0.34 m (1.1 ft)	62×23 mm (2.4×0.9 in)	84 g (3.0 oz)	39	
XF 30mm F2.8 R LM WR Macro		30	46	f/2.8–22	9/11	50°	0.1 m (0.3 ft)	60×69.5 mm (2.4×2.7 in)	195 g (6.9 oz)	43	
XF 33mm F1.4 R LM WR		33	51	f/1.4–16	10/15	46°	0.30 m (1.0 ft)	67×73.5 mm (2.6×2.9 in)	360 g (12.7 oz)	58	
XF 35mm F1.4 R		35	54	f/1.4–16	5/7	44°	0.8 m (2.6 ft)	65.0×50.4 mm (2.6×2.0 in)	187 g (6.6 oz)	52	
XF 35mm F2 R WR		35	54	f/2.0–16	6/9	44°	0.35 m (1.1 ft)	60.0×45.9 mm (2.4×1.8 in)	170 g (6.0 oz)	43	
XC 35mm F2		35	54	f/2.0–16	6/9	44°	0.35 m (1.1 ft)	58.4×46.5 mm (2.3×1.8 in)	130 g (4.6 oz)	43	
Portrait lenses
XF 50mm F1.0 R WR		50	77	f/1.0–16	9/12	32°	0.70 m (2.3 ft)	87×103.5 mm (3.4×4.1 in)	845 g (29.8 oz)	77	
XF 50mm F2 R WR		50	77	f/2.0–16	7/9	32°	0.39 m (1.3 ft)	60.0×59.4 mm (2.4×2.3 in)	200 g (7.1 oz)	46	
MKX 50-135mm T2.9		50–135	77–207	T2.9–22	17/22	12–32°	1.2 m (3.9 ft)	87×206.6 mm (3.4×8.1 in)	1,100 g (2.4 lb)	82	
XF 50-140mm F2.8 R LM OIS WR		50–140	77–215	f/2.8–22	16/23	12–32°	1.0 m (3.3 ft)	82.9×175.9 mm (3.3×6.9 in)	995 g (35.1 oz)	72	(Note: Compatible with XF 1.4X TC WR) (Note: Compatible with XF 2X TC WR)
XC 50-230mm F4.5-6.7 OIS		50–230	77–350	f/4.5~6.7–22	10/13	7–32°	1.1 m (3.6 ft)	69.5×111–177 mm (2.7×4.4–7.0 in) (W/T)	375 g (13.2 oz)	58	
XC 50-230mm F4.5-6.7 OIS II		50–230	77–350	f/4.5~6.7–22	10/13	7–32°	1.1 m (3.6 ft)	69.5×111–177 mm (2.7×4.4–7.0 in) (W/T)	375 g (13.2 oz)	58	
XF 55-200mm F3.5-4.8 R LM OIS		55–200	84–310	f/3.5~4.8–22	10/14	8.1–29°	1.1 m (3.6 ft)	75.0×118–177 mm (3.0×4.6–7.0 in) (W/T)	580 g (20.5 oz)	62	
XF 56mm F1.2 R WR		56	86	f/1.2–16	8/13	28°	0.5 m (1.6 ft)	79.4×76 mm (3.1×3.0 in)	445 g (15.7 oz)	67	
XF 56mm F1.2 R		56	86	f/1.2–16	8/11	28°	0.7 m (2.3 ft)	73.2×69.7 mm (2.9×2.7 in)	405 g (14.3 oz)	62	
XF 56mm F1.2 R APD		56	86	f/1.2–16	8/11	28°	0.7 m (2.3 ft)	73.2×69.7 mm (2.9×2.7 in)	405 g (14.3 oz)	62	Element count excludes apodization filter
XF 60mm F2.4 R Macro		60	92	f/2.4–22	8/10	26°	0.267 m (0.9 ft)	64.1×63.6 mm (2.5×2.5 in)	215 g (7.6 oz)	39	
XF 70-300mm F4-5.6 R LM OIS WR		70–300	107–460	f/4.0~5.6–22	12/17	5.4–23°	0.83 m (2.7 ft)	75×132.5–205.5 mm (3.0×5.2–8.1 in) (W/T)	580 g (20.5 oz)	67	
XF 80mm F2.8 R LM OIS WR Macro		80	123	f/2.8–22	12/16	20°	0.25 m (0.8 ft)	80×130 mm (3.1×5.1 in)	750 g (26.5 oz)	62	
XF 90mm F2 R LM WR		90	138	f/2.0–22	8/11	18°	0.6 m (2.0 ft)	75.0×105 mm (3.0×4.1 in)	540 g (19.0 oz)	62	
Telephoto lenses
XF 100-400mm F4.5-5.6 R LM OIS WR		100–400	150–610	f/4.5~5.6–22	14/21	4–16°	1.75 m (5.7 ft)	94.8×210.5–270 mm (3.7×8.3–10.6 in) (W/T)	1,375 g (3.0 lb)	77	
XF 150-600mm F5.6-8 R LM OIS WR		150–600	230–920	f/5.6~8.0–22	17/24	2.7–11°	2.4 m (7.9 ft)	99×314.5 mm (3.9×12.4 in)	1,605 g (3.5 lb)	82	
XF 200mm F2 R LM OIS WR		200	310	f/2.0–22	14/19	8.1°	1.8 m (5.9 ft)	122×205.5 mm (4.8×8.1 in)	2,265 g (5.0 lb)	105	
XF 500mm F5.6 R LM OIS WR		500	770	f/5.6–22	14/21	3.2°	2.75 m (9.0 ft)	104.5×255.5 mm (4.1×10.1 in)	1,335 g (2.9 lb)	95	
Teleconverters
XF 1.4X TC WR		1.4×		+1	3/7	÷1.4	same as original	58×15 mm (2.3×0.6 in)	130 g (4.6 oz)	—N/a	
XF 1.4X TC F2 WR		1.4×		+1	4/7	÷1.4	same as original	58×15 mm (2.3×0.6 in)	130 g (4.6 oz)	—N/a	Dedicated for 200 mm f/2
XF 2X TC WR		2×		+2	5/9	÷2	same as original	58×30.2 mm (2.3×1.2 in)	170 g (6.0 oz)	—N/a	

== Lenses for the digital medium format Fujifilm GFX system ==
Lenses equipped with the Fujifilm G-mount, which has a crop factor of 0.79× due to its sensor size of 43.8×32.9 mm (1.7×1.3 in).

Fujinon G-mount lenses for GFX cameras
Name	Img	FL (mm)	Equiv. FL (35mm)	Ap	Const. (grp/ele)	Angle	Min. focus	Dims. (Φ×L)	Wgt.	Filter (mm)	Notes & refs.
Ultra wide angle lenses
GF 20–35mm F4 R WR		20–35	16–28	f/4–22	10/14	108–76°	0.35 m (1.1 ft)	88.5×112.5 mm (3.5×4.4 in)	725 g (25.6 oz)	82	
GF 23mm F4 R LM WR		23	18	f/4–32	12/15	99.9°	0.38 m (1.2 ft)	89.8×103.0 mm (3.5×4.1 in)	845 g (29.8 oz)	82	
Wide-angle lenses
GF 30mm F3.5 R WR		30	24	f/3.5–32	10/13	84°	0.32 m (1.0 ft)	84×99.4 mm (3.3×3.9 in)	510 g (18.0 oz)	58	
GF 30mm F5.6 T/S		30	24	f/5.6–32	11/16	84.7°	0.3 m (1.0 ft)	87.1×138.5 mm (3.4×5.5 in)	1,340 g (3.0 lb)	105	Tilt/shift lens
GF 32–64mm F4 R LM WR		32–64	25–51	f/4–32	11/14	81–46.3°	0.50 m (1.6 ft)	92.6×116 mm (3.6×4.6 in)	875 g (30.9 oz)	77	
GF 32–90mm T3.5 PZ OIS WR		32–90	25–71	T3.5–32	19/25	81–33.8°	0.8 m (2.6 ft)	123.5×222.5 mm (4.9×8.8 in)	2,150 g (4.7 lb)	111	
Super EBC GF 35mm F4		35	28	f/4–22	8/10	76.1°	0.2 m (0.7 ft)	—N/a	—N/a	49	Fixed lens for GFX100RF
GF 35–70mm F4.5–5.6 WR		35–70	28–55	f/4.5~5.6–32	9/11	76–42.7°	0.35 m (1.1 ft)	84.9×73.9 mm (3.3×2.9 in)	390 g (13.8 oz)	62	
GF 45mm F2.8 R WR		45	36	f/2.8–32	8/11	62.6°	0.45 m (1.5 ft)	84×88.0 mm (3.3×3.5 in)	490 g (17.3 oz)	62	
GF 45–100mm F4 R LM OIS WR		45–100	36–79	f/4–32	12/16	62.6–30.6°	0.65 m (2.1 ft)	93×144.5 mm (3.7×5.7 in)	1,005 g (2.2 lb)	82	
Normal lenses
GF 50mm F3.5 R LM WR		50	39	f/3.5–32	6/9	57.4°	0.55 m (1.8 ft)	84×48.0 mm (3.3×1.9 in)	335 g (11.8 oz)	62	
GF 55mm F1.7 R WR		55	43	f/1.7–22	10/14	52.9°	0.5 m (1.6 ft)	94.7×99.3 mm (3.7×3.9 in)	780 g (27.5 oz)	77	
GF 63mm F2.8 R WR		63	50	f/2.8–32	8/10	46.9°	0.50 m (1.6 ft)	84.0×71.0 mm (3.3×2.8 in)	405 g (14.3 oz)	62	
GF 80mm F1.7 R WR		80	63	f/1.7–22	9/12	37.7°	0.70 m (2.3 ft)	94.7×99.2 mm (3.7×3.9 in)	795 g (28.0 oz)	77	
Portrait lenses
GF 100–200mm F5.6 R LM OIS WR		100–200	79–158	f/5.6–32	13/20	30.6–15.6°	0.6 m (2.0 ft)	89.5×183 mm (3.5×7.2 in)	1,050 g (2.3 lb)	67	
GF 110mm F2 R LM WR		110	87	f/2–22	9/14	27.9°	0.9 m (3.0 ft)	94.3×125.5 mm (3.7×4.9 in)	1,010 g (2.2 lb)	77	
GF 110mm F5.6 T/S Macro		110	87	f/5.6–32	9/11	27.9°	0.43 m (1.4 ft)	95×149 mm (3.7×5.9 in)	1,255 g (2.8 lb)	72	Tilt/shift lens
GF 120mm F4 R LM OIS WR Macro		120	95	f/24–32	9/14	25.7°	0.45 m (1.5 ft)	89.2×152.5 mm (3.5×6.0 in)	980 g (34.6 oz)	72	
Telephoto lenses
GF 250mm F4 R LM OIS WR		250	197	f/4–22	10/16	12.5°	1.4 m (4.6 ft)	108×203.5 mm (4.3×8.0 in)	1,425 g (3.1 lb)	82	
GF 500mm F5.6 R LM OIS WR		500	395	f/5.6–32	14/21	6.3°	2.75 m (9.0 ft)	104.5×246.5 mm (4.1×9.7 in)	1,375 g (3.0 lb)	95	
GF 1.4X TC WR		1.4×		+1	3/7	—N/a	same	82×26.7 mm (3.2×1.1 in)	400 g (0.9 lb)	—N/a	Compatible with 250, 500, and 100–200mm lenses

== Large format lenses ==
Large format lens crop factors
Format	Crop factor (Note: Compared to 135 still camera, nominally 24×36 mm)
4×5	0.28
4 3/4×6 1/2	0.22
5×7	0.21
6 1/2×8 1/2	0.17
8×10	0.14
10×12	0.113
11×14	0.099
12×16	0.088
18×22	0.062
20×24	0.043

Fujifilm sold large format lenses in the following series:

SWD (Super Wide Deluxe)
ultra wide angle lens with an angle of view > 100° and maximum aperture of f/5.6
SW (Super Wide)
ultra wide angle lens with an angle of view of approximately 100° and maximum aperture of f/8
W (Wide)
wide-angle lens with an angle of view 70–80° and a maximum aperture generally f/5.6 with some exceptions
CM-W (Compact Wide)
angle of view 70–80°, maximum aperture generally f/5.6
A (Apochromat)
normal lenses with an angle of view 50–70° and a maximum aperture of f/9
C/CM (Compact)
moderate wide-angle lens with an angle of view around 65°
BBL (Barrel)
not mounted in shutter
L (Long focus)
Tessar-type construction
T (Tele Type)
telephoto lenses with an angle of view 25–35°
SF (Soft focus)
deliberately undercorrected spherical aberration

Fujinon lenses for large format cameras
Fujinon Lens	35mm-equiv. FL (Angle)	Aperture range	Filter (mm)	Mass	Dims (Φ×L)	Eles/ grps	Lens board Φ	Image circle Φ	Format	Notes
Ultra wide angle lenses
SWD 65mm f/5.6 (old)	18mm (106°)	f/5.6–45	62	305 g (10.8 oz)	65×66 mm (2.6×2.6 in)	8/4	Seiko #0	172 mm (6.8 in)	4×5 / 155 mm (6.1 in) diag.	
SWD 65mm f/5.6 (new)	18mm (105°)	f/5.6–45	67	315 g (11.1 oz)	70×68.5 mm (2.8×2.7 in)	8/6	Copal #0	169 mm (6.7 in)	4×5 / 155 mm (6.1 in) diag.	
SW 65mm f/8	18mm (100°)	f/8–64	52	220 g (7.8 oz)	54×59.4 mm (2.1×2.3 in)	6/4	Seiko #0	155 mm (6.1 in)	4×5 / 155 mm (6.1 in) diag.	
SWD 75mm f/5.6 (old)	17mm (106°)	f/5.6–64	67	380 g (13.4 oz)	70×75 mm (2.8×3.0 in)	8/4	Seiko #0	200 mm (7.9 in)	4 3/4×6 1/2 / 194 mm (7.6 in) diag.	
SWD 75mm f/5.6 (new)	17mm (105°)	f/5.6–45	67	400 g (14.1 oz)	70×76.0 mm (2.8×3.0 in)	8/6	Copal #0	196 mm (7.7 in)	4 3/4×6 1/2 / 194 mm (7.6 in) diag.	
SW 75mm f/8	21mm (100°)	f/8–64	58	290 g (10.2 oz)	60×66.2 mm (2.4×2.6 in)	6/4	Seiko #0	181 mm (7.1 in)	4×5 / 155 mm (6.1 in) diag.	
SWD 90mm f/5.6 (old)	19mm (106°)	f/5.6–64	82	580 g (20.5 oz)	85×91 mm (3.3×3.6 in)	8/4	Seiko #0	238 mm (9.4 in)	5×7 / 208 mm (8.2 in) diag.	
SWD 90mm f/5.6 (new)	19mm (105°)	f/5.6–64	82	605 g (21.3 oz)	85×90.5 mm (3.3×3.6 in)	8/6	Copal #0	236 mm (9.3 in)	5×7 / 208 mm (8.2 in) diag.	
SW 90mm f/8 (old)	19mm (100°)	f/8–64	67	379 g (13.4 oz)	70×78.2 mm (2.8×3.1 in)	6/4	Seiko #0	216 mm (8.5 in)	5×7 / 208 mm (8.2 in) diag.	
SW 90mm f/8 (new)	19mm (100°)	f/8–45	67	407 g (14.4 oz)	70×83.0 mm (2.8×3.3 in)	6/6	Copal #0	216 mm (8.5 in)	5×7 / 208 mm (8.2 in) diag.	
SW 105mm f/8 (old)	22mm (100°)	f/8–64	67	405 g (14.3 oz)	70×68.5 mm (2.8×2.7 in)	6/4	Seiko #0	250 mm (9.8 in)	5×7 / 208 mm (8.2 in) diag.	
SW 105mm f/8 (new)	17mm (100°)	f/8–45	77	570 g (20.1 oz)	80×95.5 mm (3.1×3.8 in)	6/6	Copal #0	250 mm (9.8 in)	6 1/2×8 1/2 / 260 mm (10.2 in) diag.	
SW 120mm f/8	20mm (100°)	f/8–64	77	526 g (18.6 oz)	80×100.5 mm (3.1×4.0 in)	6/4	Seiko #0	290 mm (11.4 in)	6 1/2×8 1/2 / 260 mm (10.2 in) diag.	
SW 125mm f/8	17mm (96°)	f/8–45	82	745 g (26.3 oz)	85×113.5 mm (3.3×4.5 in)	6/6	Copal #0	300 mm (11.8 in)	8×10 / 311 mm (12.2 in) diag.	
SW 300mm f/8	19mm (100°)	f/8–64	145	3,250 g (7.2 lb)	150×215.5 mm (5.9×8.5 in)	6/4	Copal #3	720 mm (28.3 in)	18×22 / 694 mm (27.3 in) diag.	
Wide-angle lenses
W 105mm f/5.6	29mm (76°)	f/5.6–45	46	185 g (6.5 oz)	48×43.5 mm (1.9×1.7 in)	6/6	Copal #0	162 mm (6.4 in)	4×5 / 155 mm (6.1 in) diag.	
CM-W 105mm f/5.6	29mm (78°)	f/5.6–45	67	220 g (7.8 oz)	70×51.6 mm (2.8×2.0 in)	6/5	Copal #0	174 mm (6.9 in)	4×5 / 155 mm (6.1 in) diag.	
W 125mm f/5.6 (old)	26mm (80°)	f/5.6–64	46	150 g (5.3 oz)	48×45.2 mm (1.9×1.8 in)	6/4	Seiko #0	210 mm (8.3 in)	5×7 / 208 mm (8.2 in) diag.	
W 125mm f/5.6 (new)	28mm (80°)	f/5.6–64	55	123 g (4.3 oz)	57×50.5 mm (2.2×2.0 in)	6/6	Copal #0	198 mm (7.8 in)	4 3/4×6 1/2 / 194 mm (7.6 in) diag.	
CM-W 125mm f/5.6	26mm (78°)	f/5.6–64	67	265 g (9.3 oz)	70×57.3 mm (2.8×2.3 in)	6/5	Copal #0	204 mm (8.0 in)	5×7 / 208 mm (8.2 in) diag.	
W 135mm f/5.6 (old)	28mm (80°)	f/5.6–64	46	207 g (7.3 oz)	48×45.4 mm (1.9×1.8 in)	6/4	Seiko #0	228 mm (9.0 in)	5×7 / 208 mm (8.2 in) diag.	
W 135mm f/5.6 (new)	28mm (80°)	f/5.6–64	52	200 g (7.1 oz)	54×51.0 mm (2.1×2.0 in)	6/6	Copal #0	206 mm (8.1 in)	5×7 / 208 mm (8.2 in) diag.	
CM-W 135mm f/5.6	28mm (76°)	f/5.6–64	67	270 g (9.5 oz)	70×59.1 mm (2.8×2.3 in)	6/6	Copal #0	214 mm (8.4 in)	5×7 / 208 mm (8.2 in) diag.	
W 150mm f/5.6 (old)	25mm (80°)	f/5.6–64	46	227 g (8.0 oz)	48×49.4 mm (1.9×1.9 in)	6/4	Seiko #0	245 mm (9.6 in)	6 1/2×8 1/2 / 260 mm (10.2 in) diag.	
W 150mm f/5.6 (new)	31mm (80°)	f/5.6–64	55	235 g (8.3 oz)}	57×57.0 mm (2.2×2.2 in)	6/6	Copal #0	224 mm (8.8 in)	5×7 / 208 mm (8.2 in) diag.	
CM-W 150mm f/5.6	31mm (73°)	f/5.6–64	67	280 g (9.9 oz)	70×62.4 mm (2.8×2.5 in)	6/6	Copal #0	223 mm (8.8 in)	5×7 / 208 mm (8.2 in) diag.	
W 150mm f/6.3	33mm (67°)	f/6.3–64	40.5	180 g (6.3 oz)	42×33.3 mm (1.7×1.3 in)	4/3	Seiko #0	198 mm (7.8 in)	4 3/4×6 1/2 / 194 mm (7.6 in) diag.	
W 180mm f/5.6 (old)	25mm (80°)	f/5.6–64	58	410 g (14.5 oz)	60×59.3 mm (2.4×2.3 in)	6/4	Copal #1	305 mm (12.0 in)	8×10 / 311 mm (12.2 in) diag.	
W 180mm f/5.6 (new)	30mm (80°)	f/5.6–64}	62	400 g (14.1 oz)	65×64.5 mm (2.6×2.5 in)	6/6	Copal #1	280 mm (11.0 in)	6 1/2×8 1/2 / 260 mm (10.2 in) diag.	
CM-W 180mm f/5.6	30mm (71°)	f/5.6–64	67	405 g (14.3 oz)	70×65.7 mm (2.8×2.6 in)	6/5	Copal #1	260 mm (10.2 in)	6 1/2×8 1/2 / 260 mm (10.2 in) diag.	
A 180mm f/9	30mm (70°)	f/9–90	46	170 g (6.0 oz)	48×45.0 mm (1.9×1.8 in)	6/4	Copal #0	250 mm (9.8 in)	6 1/2×8 1/2 / 260 mm (10.2 in) diag.	
W 210mm f/5.6 (old)	29mm (80°)	f/5.6–64	58	503 g (17.7 oz)	60×67.0 mm (2.4×2.6 in)	6/4	Copal #1	352 mm (13.9 in)	8×10 / 311 mm (12.2 in) diag.	
W 210mm f/5.6 (new)	29mm (80°)	f/5.6–64	67	465 g (16.4 oz)	70×70.0 mm (2.8×2.8 in)	6/5	Copal #1	300 mm (11.8 in)	8×10 / 311 mm (12.2 in) diag.	
CM-W 210mm f/5.6	29mm (72°)	f/5.6–64	67	505 g (17.8 oz)	70×74.5 mm (2.8×2.9 in)	6/5	Copal #1	309 mm (12.2 in)	8×10 / 311 mm (12.2 in) diag.	
A 240mm f/9	33mm (70°)	f/9–90	52	225 g (7.9 oz)	54×55.0 mm (2.1×2.2 in)	6/4	Copal #0	336 mm (13.2 in)	8×10 / 311 mm (12.2 in) diag.	
W 250mm f/6.3	35mm (64°)	f/6.3–64	67	590 g (20.8 oz)	70×83.0 mm (2.8×3.3 in)	6/4	Copal #1	312 mm (12.3 in)	8×10 / 311 mm (12.2 in) diag.	
CM-W 250mm f/6.3	35mm (65°)	f/6.3–90	67	510 g (18.0 oz)	70×80.9 mm (2.8×3.2 in)	6/6	Copal #1	320 mm (12.6 in)	8×10 / 311 mm (12.2 in) diag.	
W 250mm f/6.7	28mm (80°)	f/6.7–64	67	690 g (24.3 oz)	70×78.5 mm (2.8×3.1 in)	6/4	Copal #1	398 mm (15.7 in)	10×12 / 382 mm (15.0 in) diag.	
W 300mm f/5.6	34mm (80°)	f/5.6–90	77	1,228 g (2.7 lb)	80×95.0 mm (3.1×3.7 in)	6/4	Copal #3	420 mm (16.5 in)	10×12 / 382 mm (15.0 in) diag.	
CM-W 300mm f/5.6	34mm (69°)	f/5.6–90	77	965 g (2.1 lb)	80×90.0 mm (3.1×3.5 in)	6/5	Copal #3	412 mm (16.2 in)	10×12 / 382 mm (15.0 in) diag.	
C 300mm f/8.5	34mm (66°)	f/8.5–64	52	250 g (8.8 oz)	54×44.9 mm (2.1×1.8 in)	4/4	Copal #1	380 mm (15.0 in)	10×12 / 382 mm (15.0 in) diag.	
A 300mm f/9	34mm (70°)	f/9–90	55	410 g (14.5 oz)	57×63.5 mm (2.2×2.5 in)	6/4	Copal #1	420 mm (16.5 in)	10×12 / 382 mm (15.0 in) diag.	
W 360mm f/6.3	36mm (80°)	f/6.3–90	86	1,533 g (3.4 lb)	90×113.5 mm (3.5×4.5 in)	6/4	Copal #3	485 mm (19.1 in)	11×14 / 437 mm (17.2 in) diag.	
CM-W 360mm f/6.5	36mm (68°)	f/6.3–128	86	1,175 g (2.6 lb)	90×107.2 mm (3.5×4.2 in)	6/6	Copal #3	485 mm (19.1 in)	11×14 / 437 mm (17.2 in) diag.	
A 360mm f/10	36mm (70°)	f/10–90	58	465 g (16.4 oz)	60×76.5 mm (2.4×3.0 in)	6/4	Copal #1	504 mm (19.8 in)	11×14 / 437 mm (17.2 in) diag.	
A 600mm f/11	26mm (70°)	f/11–90	95	1,710 g (3.8 lb)	100×131.1 mm (3.9×5.2 in)	6/4	Copal #3	840 mm (33.1 in)	20×24 / 1,008 mm (39.7 in) diag.	
Normal lenses
BBL 180mm f/4.5	40mm (59°)	f/4.5–64	49	254 g (9.0 oz)	51×49 mm (2.0×1.9 in)	4/3	—N/a	205 mm (8.1 in)	4 3/4×6 1/2 / 194 mm (7.6 in) diag.	Supplied without shutter; 56 mm / P=1.0 mounting hole
SF 180mm f/5.6	40mm (58°)	f/5.6–22	46	240 g (8.5 oz)	48×42.5 mm (1.9×1.7 in)	3/3	Copal #1	200 mm (7.9 in)	4 3/4×6 1/2 / 194 mm (7.6 in) diag.	Soft focus
BBL 210mm f/4.5	44mm (59°)	f/4.5–64	58	386 g (13.6 oz)	60×56.5 mm (2.4×2.2 in)	4/3	—N/a	240 mm (9.4 in)	5×7 / 208 mm (8.2 in) diag.	Supplied without shutter; 62 mm / P=1.0 mounting hole
L 210mm f/5.6	44mm (59°)	f/5.6–64	49	320 g (11.3 oz)	51×49.0 mm (2.0×1.9 in)	4/4	Copal #1	240 mm (9.4 in)	5×7 / 208 mm (8.2 in) diag.	
BBL 250mm f/4.5	42mm (59°)	f/4.5–64	67	641 g (22.6 oz)	70×67 mm (2.8×2.6 in)	4/3	—N/a	286 mm (11.3 in)	6 1/2×8 1/2 / 260 mm (10.2 in) diag.	Supplied without shutter; 75 mm / P=1.0 mounting hole
SF 250mm f/5.6	35mm (58°)	f/5.6–22	67	550 g (19.4 oz)	70×61.0 mm (2.8×2.4 in)	3/3	Copal #3	300 mm (11.8 in)	8×10 / 311 mm (12.2 in) diag.	Soft focus
BBL 300mm f/4.5	42mm (59°)	f/4.5–64	82	1,010 g (2.2 lb)	85×81 mm (3.3×3.2 in)	4/3	—N/a	343 mm (13.5 in)	8×10 / 311 mm (12.2 in) diag.	Supplied without shutter; 90 mm / P=1.0 mounting hole
L 300mm f/5.6	42mm (59°)	f/5.6–64	67	800 g (28.2 oz)	70×74.0 mm (2.8×2.9 in)	4/4	Copal #3	343 mm (13.5 in)	8×10 / 311 mm (12.2 in) diag.	
SF 420mm f/5.6	42mm (58°)	f/5.6–22	82	980 g (34.6 oz)	85×77.5 mm (3.3×3.1 in)	3/3	—N/a	500 mm (19.7 in)	11×14 / 437 mm (17.2 in) diag.	Soft focus; supplied without shutter
L 420mm f/8	58mm (53°)	f/8–64	67	900 g (31.7 oz)	70×88.2 mm (2.8×3.5 in)	4/4	Copal #3	480 mm (18.9 in)	10×12 / 382 mm (15.0 in) diag.	
CM-W 450mm f/8	45mm (60°)	f/8–128	86	1,140 g (2.5 lb)	90×112.6 mm (3.5×4.4 in)	6/6	Copal #3	520 mm (20.5 in)	11×14 / 437 mm (17.2 in) diag.	
C 450mm f/12.5	45mm (57°)	f/12.5–64	52	270 g (9.5 oz)	54×53.3 mm (2.1×2.1 in)	4/4	Copal #1	486 mm (19.1 in)	11×14 / 437 mm (17.2 in) diag.	
C 600mm f/11.5	53mm (55°)	f/11.5–64	67	575 g (20.3 oz)	70×65.5 mm (2.8×2.6 in)	4/4	Copal #3	620 mm (24.4 in)	12×16 / 492 mm (19.4 in) diag.	
A 1200mm f/24	52mm (50°)	f/24–90	102	2,600 g (5.7 lb)	106×177.5 mm (4.2×7.0 in)	6/4	Copal #3	1,120 mm (44.1 in)	20×24 / 1,008 mm (39.7 in) diag.	
Portrait lenses
T 300mm f/8	62mm (39°)	f/8–64	67	415 g (14.6 oz)	70×97.5 mm (2.8×3.8 in)	5/5	Copal #0	213 mm (8.4 in)	5×7 / 208 mm (8.2 in) diag.	
T 400mm f/8 (old)	83mm (33°)	f/8–64	67	760 g (26.8 oz)	70×130.5 mm (2.8×5.1 in)	5/5	Copal #1	240 mm (9.4 in)	5×7 / 208 mm (8.2 in) diag.	
T 400mm f/8 (new)	83mm (31°)	f/8–64	67	600 g (21.2 oz)	70×127.5 mm (2.8×5.0 in)	5/5	Copal #1	220 mm (8.7 in)	5×7 / 208 mm (8.2 in) diag.	
T 600mm f/12	100mm (24°)	f/12–90	67	1,000 g (2.2 lb)	70×179.0 mm (2.8×7.0 in)	5/5	Copal #1	260 mm (10.2 in)	6 1/2×8 1/2 / 260 mm (10.2 in) diag.	

== Medium format lenses ==
=== G690 ===
Fuji Photo Film introduced a new line of medium format (6×9) rangefinder cameras with interchangeable lenses in 1968 with the Fujica G690; in time, several other cameras were introduced, including two with 6×7 frame sizes.

Fujinon lenses for interchangeable lens rangefinder medium format cameras
Fujinon Lens	35mm-equiv. FL (Angle)		Aperture range	Filter (mm)	Min. focus	Eles/ grps	Dimensions		Notes
Fujinon Lens	6×9	6×7	Aperture range	Filter (mm)	Min. focus	Eles/ grps	Φ×L	Wgt.	Notes
Ultra wide angle lenses
SW S 50mm f/5.6	21mm (91°)	24mm (83°)	f/5.6–32	72	1 m (39 in)	8/6	90×84 mm (3.5×3.3 in)	595 g (21.0 oz)	
Wide-angle lenses
SW S 65mm f/5.6	28mm (76°)	32mm (68°)	f/5.6–32	72	1 m (39 in)	8/4	90×82 mm (3.5×3.2 in)	610 g (22 oz)	
SW S 65mm f/8	28mm (76°)	32mm (68°)	f/8–32	72	1 m (39 in)	6/4	90×77 mm (3.5×3.0 in)	600 g (21 oz)	
Normal lenses
S 100mm f/3.5	43mm (54°)	49mm (48°)	f/3.5–32	72	1 m (39 in)	4/3	90×83 mm (3.5×3.3 in)	605 g (21.3 oz)	Tessar design
EBC AE 100mm f/3.5	43mm (54°)	49mm (48°)	f/3.5–32	72	1 m (39 in)	4/3	90×83 mm (3.5×3.3 in)	700 g (25 oz)	Tessar design, aperture-priority autoexposure or manual
Portrait lenses
TS 150mm f/5.6	64mm (37°)	73mm (33°)	f/5.6–45	72	2 m (79 in)	5/4	90×85 mm (3.5×3.3 in)	910 g (32 oz)	
TS 180mm f/5.6	77mm (31°)	88mm (28°)	f/5.6–45	72	2.5 m (98 in)	5/5	90×97 mm (3.5×3.8 in)	1,025 g (36.2 oz)	

=== Fixed lens cameras ===
The first fixed-lens medium format cameras were named Fujipet and took square (6×6) format pictures.

Lenses for fixed-lens Fujipet cameras
Name	Img	FL (mm)	Ap	Const. (grp/ele)	Angle	Min. focus	Camera(s)	Filter (mm)	Notes & refs.
70mm f/11		70	f/11	1/1	59°	fixed	Fujipet, Fujipet EE	—N/a	

After the G690/G670 line of interchangeable-lens rangefinders was discontinued, Fuji Photo Film produced a series of fixed lens cameras, most fitted with rangefinders, with nominal frame sizes of 6×4.5, 6×7, 6×9, and 6×17 cm.

Fujinon lenses for fixed lens rangefinder medium format cameras
EBC Fujinon Lens	35mm-equiv. FL (Angle)	Aperture range	Filter (mm)	Eles/ grps	Format		Notes
Wide-angle lenses
Super EBC 45mm f/4	28mm (76°)	f/4–22	52	7/5	6×4.5 70.6 mm (2.8 in) diag.		GA645Wi
W 45mm f/5.6	28mm (76°)	f/5.6–22	49	6/5	6×4.5 70.6 mm (2.8 in) diag.		GS645W
Super EBC 55~90mm f/4.5~6.9	34–55mm (43–65°)	f/4.5~6.9–22	52	10/10	6×4.5 70.6 mm (2.8 in) diag.		GA645Zi
55mm f/4.5	6×7: 27mm (78°) 6×6: 30mm (72°)	f/4.5–22	?	10/8	6×6 79.2 mm (3.1 in) diag.	6×7 88.5 mm (3.5 in) diag.	Switchable format; GF670W
W 60mm f/4	37mm (61°)	f/4–22	?	7/5	6×4.5 70.6 mm (2.8 in) diag.		GS645S
Super EBC 60mm f/4	37mm (61°)	f/4–22	52	7/6	6×4.5 70.6 mm (2.8 in) diag.		GA645, GA645i
SW 65mm f/5.6	28mm (76°)	f/5.6–32	67	6/4	6×9 101 mm (4.0 in) diag.		GSW690, GSW690II, GSW690III
90mm f/3.5	39mm (59°)	f/3.5–32	67	5/5	6×9 101 mm (4.0 in) diag.		GW690, GW690II, GW690III
SW 105mm f/8	26mm (80°)	f/8–45	77	6/4	6×17 177.1 mm (7.0 in) diag.		G617
Normal lenses
S 75mm f/3.4	46mm (50°)	f/3.4–22	?	5/4	6×4.5 70.6 mm (2.8 in) diag.		GS645
80mm f/3.5	6×7: 39mm (58°) 6×6: 44mm (53°)	f/3.5–22	?	6/4	6×6 79.2 mm (3.1 in) diag.	6×7 88.5 mm (3.5 in) diag.	Switchable format; GF670 (also sold as Voigtländer Bessa III/667)
90mm f/3.5	44mm (52°)	f/3.5–32	67	5/5	6×7 88.5 mm (3.5 in) diag.		GW670II, GW670III

=== GX680 ===
Fujinon GX (M) are lenses for the Fuji GX680 series of cameras, which take pictures with a 6×8 cm (nominal) frame size.

Fujinon GX(M) lenses for GX680 cameras
EBC Fujinon Lens	35mm-equiv. FL (angle)	Aperture range	Filter (mm)	Mass	Dimensions	Elements/ groups	MSRP (×1000 ¥)	Notes
Wide-angle lenses
50mm f/5.6 GX (M)	23mm (87°)	f/5.6–45	112	1,250 g (2.76 lb)	115×115×125 mm (4.5×4.5×4.9 in)	12/9	267	cannot be used with full movements due to smaller image circle
65mm f/5.6 GX (M)	30mm (72°)	f/5.6–45	95	1,190 g (2.62 lb)	107×107×116 mm (4.2×4.2×4.6 in)	10/9	225	
80mm f/5.6 GX (M)	37mm (61°)	f/5.6–45	95	1,100 g (2.4 lb)	101×107×113 mm (4.0×4.2×4.4 in)	8/8	190	
Normal lenses
100mm f/4.0 GX (M)	46mm (51°)	f/4–45	82	910 g (32 oz)	101×107×101 mm (4.0×4.2×4.0 in)	8/8	147	
100–200mm f/5.6 GX (M)	46–92mm (27–51°)	f/5.6–64	105	2,150 g (4.74 lb)	118×118.5×176 mm (4.6×4.7×6.9 in)	14/11	398	optional (not supplied) mount of support rail under the camera and a support ring on the lens is necessary, tilt functions not usable, 80mm rail extension cannot be used
115mm f/3.2 GX MD	53mm (45°)	f/3.2–32	95	870 g (31 oz)	101×107×95 mm (4.0×4.2×3.7 in)	8/6	183	
125mm f/3.2 GX MD	57mm (41°)	f/3.2–32	95	895 g (31.6 oz)	101×107×96 mm (4.0×4.2×3.8 in)	8/6	178	
125mm f/5.6 GX (M)	57mm (41°)	f/5.6–45	82	545 g (19.2 oz)	101×107×80 mm (4.0×4.2×3.1 in)	6/5	142	
135mm f/5.6 GX (M)	62mm (39°)	f/5.6–45	82	565 g (19.9 oz)	101×107×79 mm (4.0×4.2×3.1 in)	6/6	122	the most common "kit lens" for this system
150mm f/4.5 GX (M)	69mm (35°)	f/4.5–45	82	705 g (24.9 oz)	101×107×91 mm (4.0×4.2×3.6 in)	6/4	153	
Portrait lenses
180mm f/3.2 GX MD	82mm (29°)	f/3.2–32	95	1,030 g (2.27 lb)	101×107×105 mm (4.0×4.2×4.1 in)	7/5	160	
180mm f/5.6 GX (M)	82mm (29°)	f/5.6–45	82	800 g (28 oz)	101×107×104 mm (4.0×4.2×4.1 in)	6/6	195	
190mm f/8.0 GX SF	87mm (28°)	f/8–64	82	690 g (24 oz)	101×107×104 mm (4.0×4.2×4.1 in)	3/3	156	unique "sieve" aperture design for soft focus effect
210mm f/5.6 GX (M)	96mm (25°)	f/5.6–64	82	835 g (29.5 oz)	101×107×103 mm (4.0×4.2×4.1 in)	5/5	160	
250mm f/5.6 GX (M)	115mm (21°)	f/5.6–64	82	925 g (32.6 oz)	101×107×105 mm (4.0×4.2×4.1 in)	5/4	164	
300mm f/6.3 GX (M)	137mm (18°)	f/6.3–64	82	1,100 g (2.4 lb)	101×107×139 mm (4.0×4.2×5.5 in)	5/5	229	
Telephoto lenses
500mm f/8.0 GX (M)	229mm (11°)	f/8–64	82	1,660 g (3.66 lb)	101×107×245 mm (4.0×4.2×9.6 in)	6/6	395	Supplied with an optional mounting rail, which stabilises the lens but prevents camera movements entirely. Tilt functions not usable. Introduced in 1999.

=== GX617 ===
The GX617 is an interchangeable-lens camera that takes panoramic photos with a nominal frame size of 56×168 mm (2.2×6.6 in), which requires illuminating a circle with a diameter of 177.1 mm (7.0 in), so GX617 lenses are comparable in size and optical construction to large format lenses. All GX617 lenses are fitted with a Copal No. 0 leaf shutter, with shutter speed settings ranging from 1 to 1/500 sec plus (B)ulb.

Fujinon lenses for GX617 cameras
EBC Fujinon Lens	35mm-equiv. FL	Aperture range	Filter (mm)	Mass	Dimensions	Elements/ groups	Min. focus	Notes
Wide-angle lenses
SWD 90mm f/5.6	22mm (89°)	f/5.6–45	77	1,050 g (2.3 lb)	167×100×128 mm (6.6×3.9×5.0 in)	8/6	2.0 m (6.6 ft)	center filter available
SW 105mm f/8	26mm (80.3°)	f/8–45	77	1,060 g (2.3 lb)	167×100×144 mm (6.6×3.9×5.7 in)	6/6	1.2 m (3.9 ft)	center filter available
Normal lenses
W 180mm f/6.7	44mm (52.4°)	f/6.7–45	77	1,200 g (2.6 lb)	167×100×206 mm (6.6×3.9×8.1 in)	6/6	2.7 m (8.9 ft)	
Portrait lenses
T 300mm f/8	73mm (32.8°)	f/8–45	77	1,315 g (2.9 lb)	167×100×253 mm (6.6×3.9×10.0 in)	6/5	9.0 m (29.5 ft)	

=== GX645 AF ===
Hasselblad and Fujifilm jointly designed the H system cameras and lenses, with Fujifilm responsible for manufacturing. Each lens has an in-lens electronic leaf shutter, and the HC lenses also were sold with Fujinon branding. The Hasselblad H1 was sold with cosmetic changes as the Fujifilm GX645AF, but subsequent H system cameras do not have a Fujifilm equivalent. H system cameras accept backs which use either 120 film in the 645 format or several different sizes of digital image sensors, all of which are larger than the 36×24 mm (1.42×0.94 in) frame size of 135 film or equivalent "full-frame" sensors.

The 645 format is nominally 6×4.5 cm, but actual frame measurements are 56×41.5 mm (2.20×1.63 in), which gives a crop factor (aka focal length multiplier) of 0.62 compared to 135 film. For comparison, a H system lens with a focal length of 80 mm using an H system film back would have the equivalent coverage of a lens with a focal length of approximately 50 mm on a "full-frame" camera.

HC Interchangeable lenses for Fujifilm 645 AF cameras
FL (mm)	Apr.	Name	Construction		Min. Focus	Dimensions			Notes
FL (mm)	Apr.	Name	Ele	Grp	Min. Focus	Φ×L	Wgt.	Filter (mm)	Notes
Ultra wide angle lenses
35	f/3.5–32	HC 3,5/35	11	10	0.50 m (1 ft 8 in)	100×123.5 mm (3.9×4.9 in)	960 g (34 oz)	95	
Wide angle lenses
50	f/3.5–32	HC 3,5/50	11	7	0.60 m (2 ft 0 in)	86.0×116 mm (3.4×4.6 in)	875 g (30.9 oz)	77	
Normal lenses
80	f/2.8–32	HC 2,8/80	6	6	0.70 m (2 ft 4 in)	83.0×69.5 mm (3.3×2.7 in)	470 g (17 oz)	67	
Portrait lenses
150	f/3.2–45	HC 3,2/150	9	8	1.30 m (4 ft 3 in)	86.0×123.5 mm (3.4×4.9 in)	950 g (34 oz)	77	
Telephoto lenses
210	f/4–45	HC 4/210	10	6	1.80 m (5 ft 11 in)	86.0×165.0 mm (3.4×6.5 in)	1,180 g (42 oz)	77	
Zoom lenses
50~110	f/3.5~4.5–32	HC 3,5~4,5/50~110	14	9	0.70 m (2 ft 4 in)	102.5×149.5 mm (4.0×5.9 in)	1,625 g (57.3 oz)	95	
Teleconverters
1.7×	1.7× (1 1/2 stops)	H 1.7X Converter	6	4	—N/a	85.0×56.0 mm (3.3×2.2 in)	465 g (16.4 oz)	—N/a	Not compatible with HC 3,5/35 or HC 3,5-4,5/50-110.

== Enlarging lenses ==
Fujinar-E

- 50mm 1:4.5
- 75mm 1:4.5
- 105mm 1:4.5

Fujinon-ES is a 4-element line, using a Tessar design.

- 75mm 1:4.5
- 90mm 1:4.5
- 135mm 1:4.5

Fujinon-EP are high-quality enlarging lenses with 6 elements in 4 groups

- 38mm 1:4.5
- 50mm 1:3.5
- 75mm 1:5.6
- 90mm 1:5.6
- 135mm 1:5.6

Fujinon-EX Some consist of 6 elements in 4 groups, some are 6 elements is 6 groups (Fuji's brochure advertised theme this way: "Because our air-spaced element design increases the number of air-to-glass surfaces, thereby increasing corner sharpness and image quality over cemented element designs".) All with Fuji's EBC multicoating (Electron Beam Coating)

- 50mm 1:2.8, flange mounting screws: 39 P=1/26"
- 75mm 1:4.5, flange mounting screws: 39 P=1/26"
- 90mm 1:5.6, flange mounting screws: 39 P=1/26"
- 105mm 1:5.6, flange mounting screws: 39 P=1/26"
- 135mm 1:5.6, flange mounting screws: 53 P=0.75

== C-Mount lenses ==
"Fujinon-TV" CCTV Lenses: Manual Fixed for 1" sensors Fuji GX617

- 8mm 1:1.8 CF8A
- 12.5mm 1:1.4 CF12.5A
- 25mm 1:0.85 CF25L
- 25mm 1:1.4 CF25B
- 50mm 1:0.7 CF50L
- 50mm 1:1.4 CF50B
- 75mm 1:1.8 CF75A

== Monoculars and Binoculars ==
- PS-910 Passive Night Vision Monocular
  - Although the PS-910 is a first-generation night-vision device using the cascade tube system, it features digital distortion correction and thus has the performance of a second-generation device. It accepts 2 AA-size batteries.
- Mariner XL Series
- Nautilus Series
- Poseidon Series
- Polaris Series
- Techno-Stabi
- Stabiscope

== See also ==
- Nikkor
- Rokkor
- Takumar
- Zuiko
- Yashinon
- Yashikor
