= Takumar =

Camera lens brand used by Asahi/Pentax

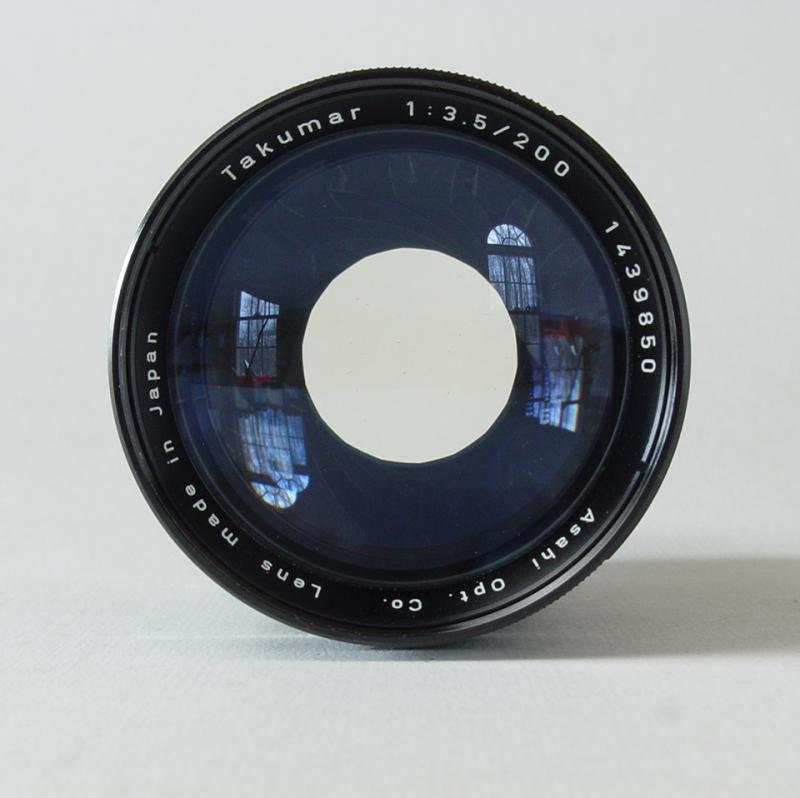
Takumar 1:3.5/200mm

Takumar is the name that Asahi Optical gave to its lenses, notably but not exclusively those for its own SLR cameras. Named after the Japanese-American portrait painter, Takuma Kajiwara (梶原啄磨, Kajiwara Takuma), whose brother Kumao Kajiwara founded Asahi Optical. The name adorned its lenses until 1975, when Asahi switched from the M42 screw mount to the bayonet K-mount. K-mount lenses were simply named "SMC Pentax". Some Takumar lenses were also made for the K-mount.

== Details ==
The Takumar designation was used on lenses designed for Asahi's 35 mm cameras, 6×7 cameras, and for other purposes too.

- Takumar lenses were made in M37 screwmount for the original Asahiflex cameras and continued into the M42 period.
- Auto-Takumar lenses were a type of preset lens. The user selected an aperture then engaged a lever to energise the stopping-down mechanism. The camera would then trip this mechanism when the shutter was fired.
- Super-Takumar lenses featured an improved form of lens coating (to reduce flare) and a more sophisticated stopping-down mechanism. There was a switch on the lens to select "Auto" or "Manual" modes. In manual mode, the lens would always be in the selected aperture. In Auto mode, the lens would remain wide open (at maximum aperture) until a pin on the rear of the lens was pushed in. This pin would be automatically pushed in by the camera when the shutter was tripped.
- Super-Multi-Coated (later SMC) Takumar. These lenses introduced Asahi's lens multi-coating process (to further reduce reflections and flare). They also introduced a lug on the rear of the lens which moved with the aperture selected. When used with a camera body which could read the lug, this enabled the use of open-aperture metering. Examples of such cameras are Asahi's Spotmatic F and the ES/ESII. These SMC-Takumar M42 thread mount lenses included: 15/3.5 rectilinear ultra-wide angle, 17/4 full-frame fisheye, 20/4.5, 24/3.5, 28/3.5, 35/2, 35/2.8, 50/1.4, 50/4 macro, 55/1.8, 55/2, 85/1.8, 100/4 macro, 105/2.8, 120/2.8, 135/2.5, 135/3.5, 150/4, 200/4, 300/4, 400/5.6, 500/4.5, 1000/8.

Pentax resurrected the Takumar name in the 1980s and 1990s for a budget line of zoom and prime lenses that lacked the Pentax "Super Multi-Coating" anti-reflective coating that reduces lens flare. These lenses are marked "Takumar (Bayonet)" or "Takumar-F" to distinguish them from the older screw-mount Takumar lenses.

Non-Asahi cameras with Asahi lenses branded Takumar include the Suzuki Press Van and two versions of the Takane Mine Six.

== Gallery ==
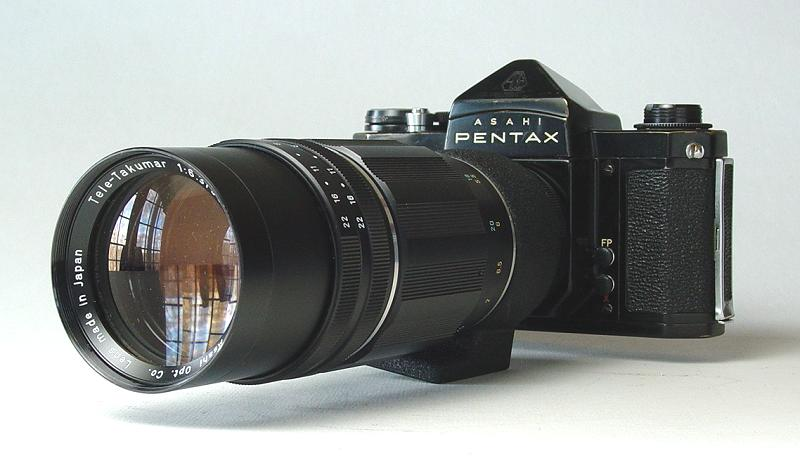
Tele-Takumar 1:6.3 300 mm

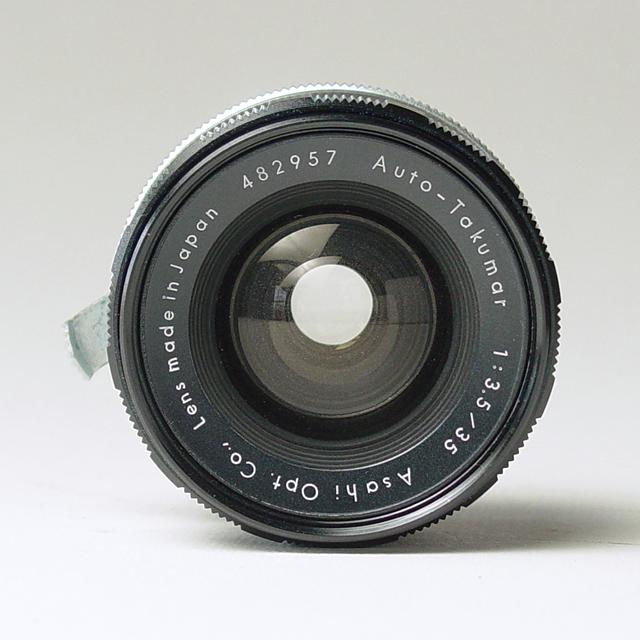
Auto-Takumar 1:3.5/35mm

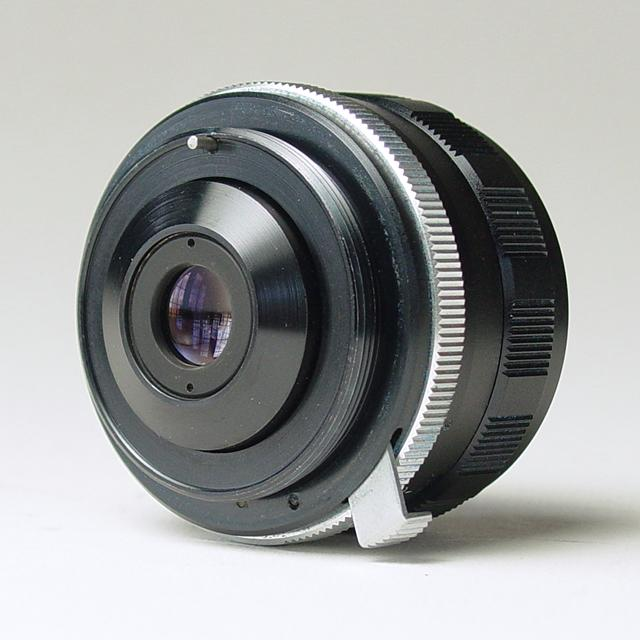
Auto-Takumar 1:3.5/35mm

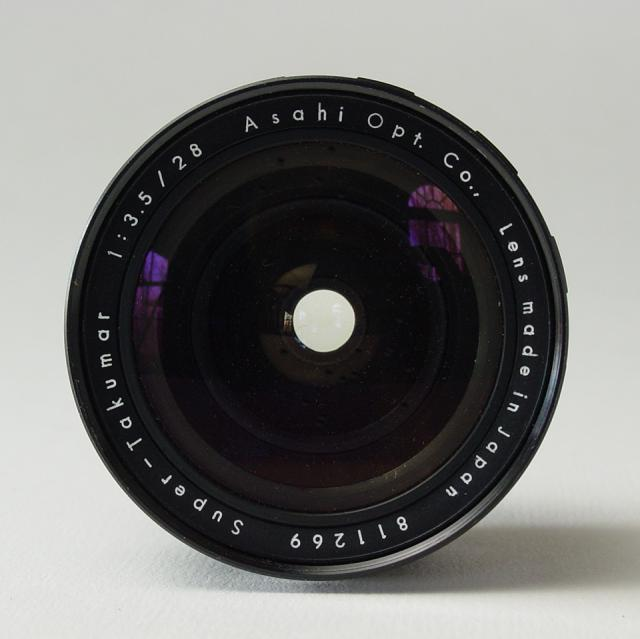
Super-Takumar 1:3.5/28mm

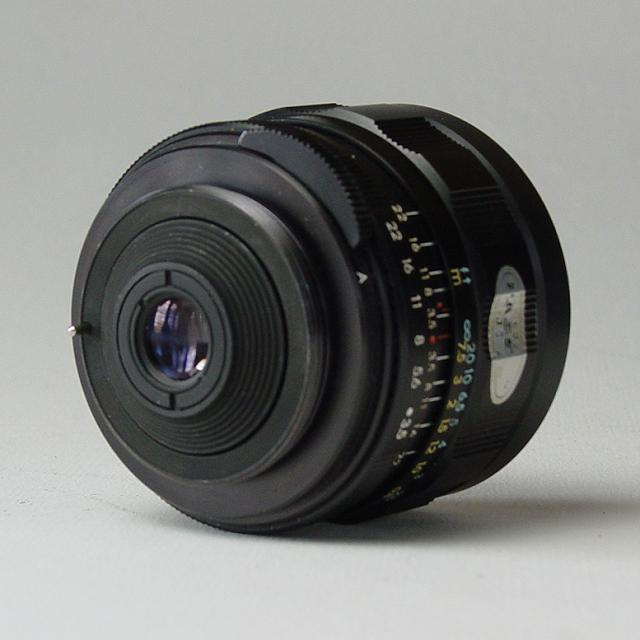
Super-Takumar 1:3.5/28mm

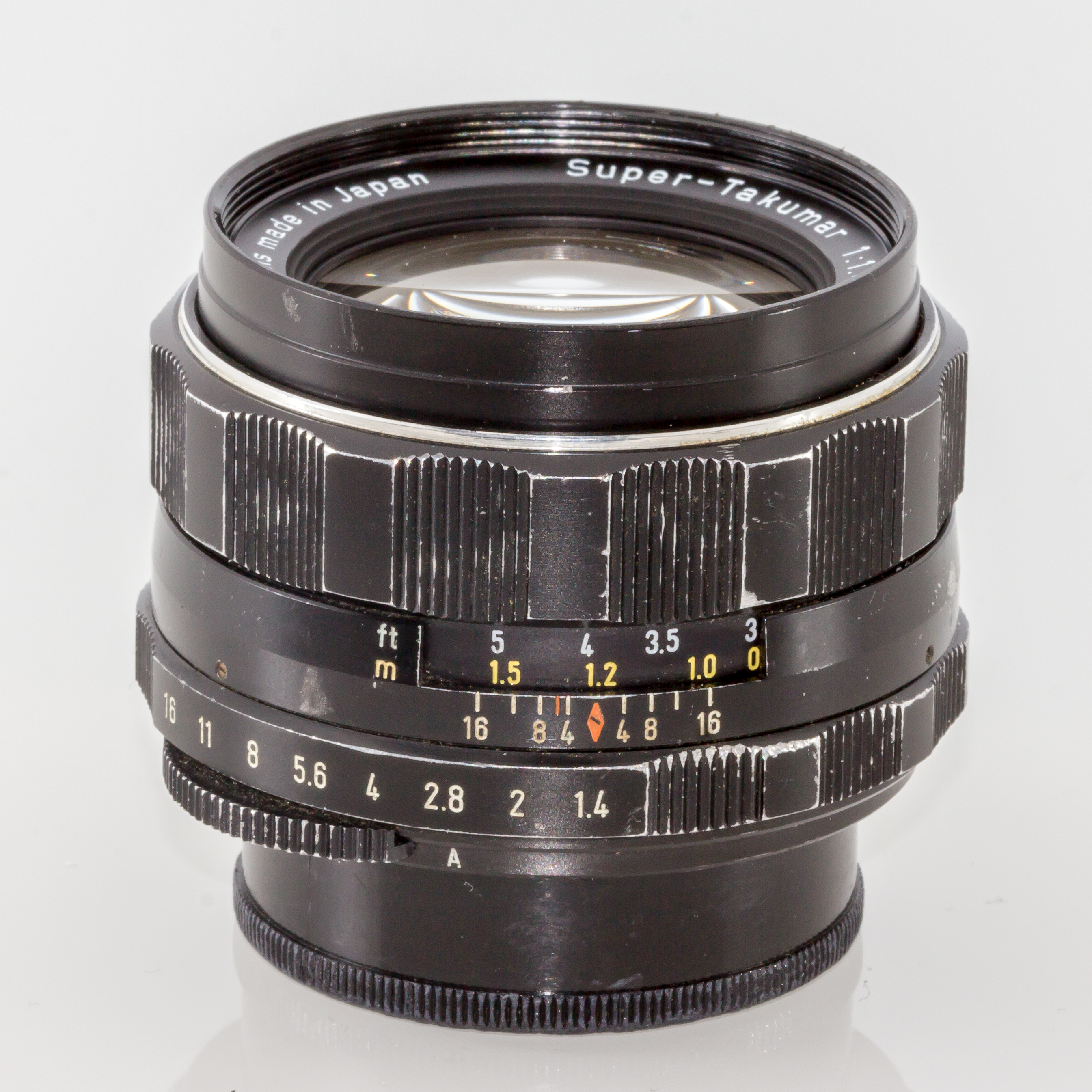
Super-Takumar 1:1.4/50mm

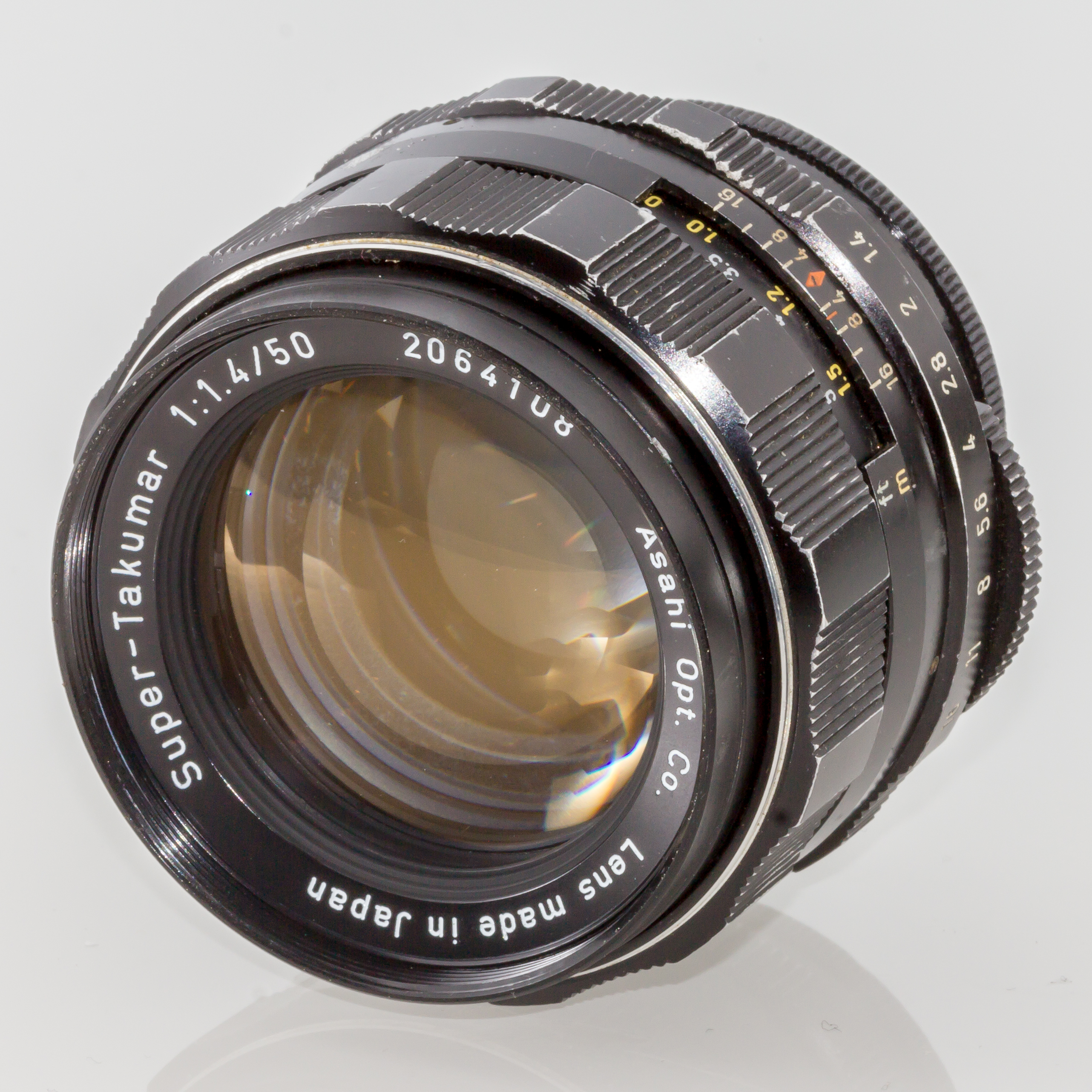
Super-Takumar 1:1.4/50mm

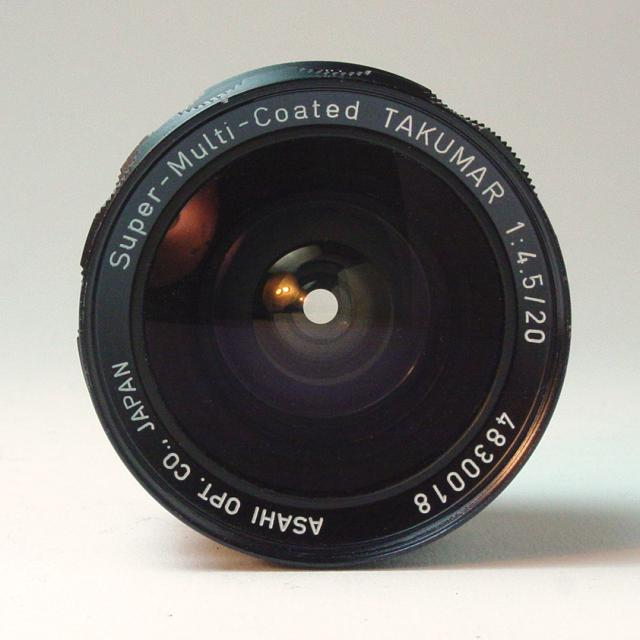
Super-Multi-Coated Takumar 1:4.5 20 mm

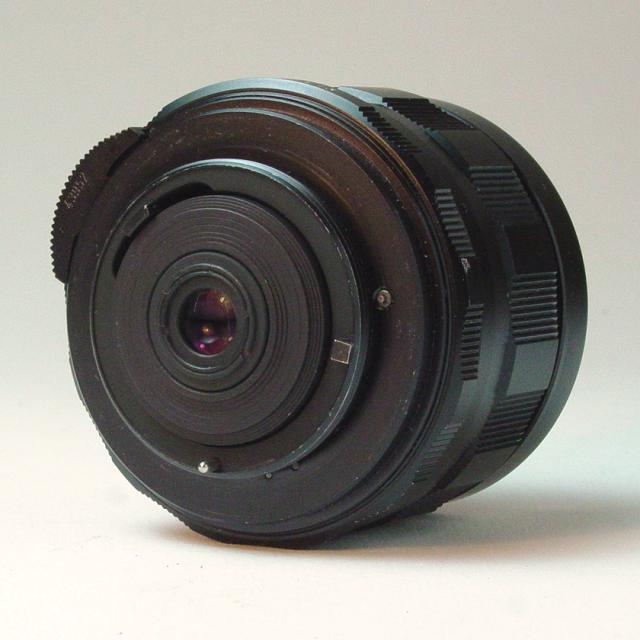
Super-Multi-Coated Takumar 1:4.5 20 mm

== See also ==
- Nikkor
- Rokkor
- Fujinon
- Zuiko
- Yashinon
- Yashikor
