= Rokkor =

Camera lens brand (1940–1981)

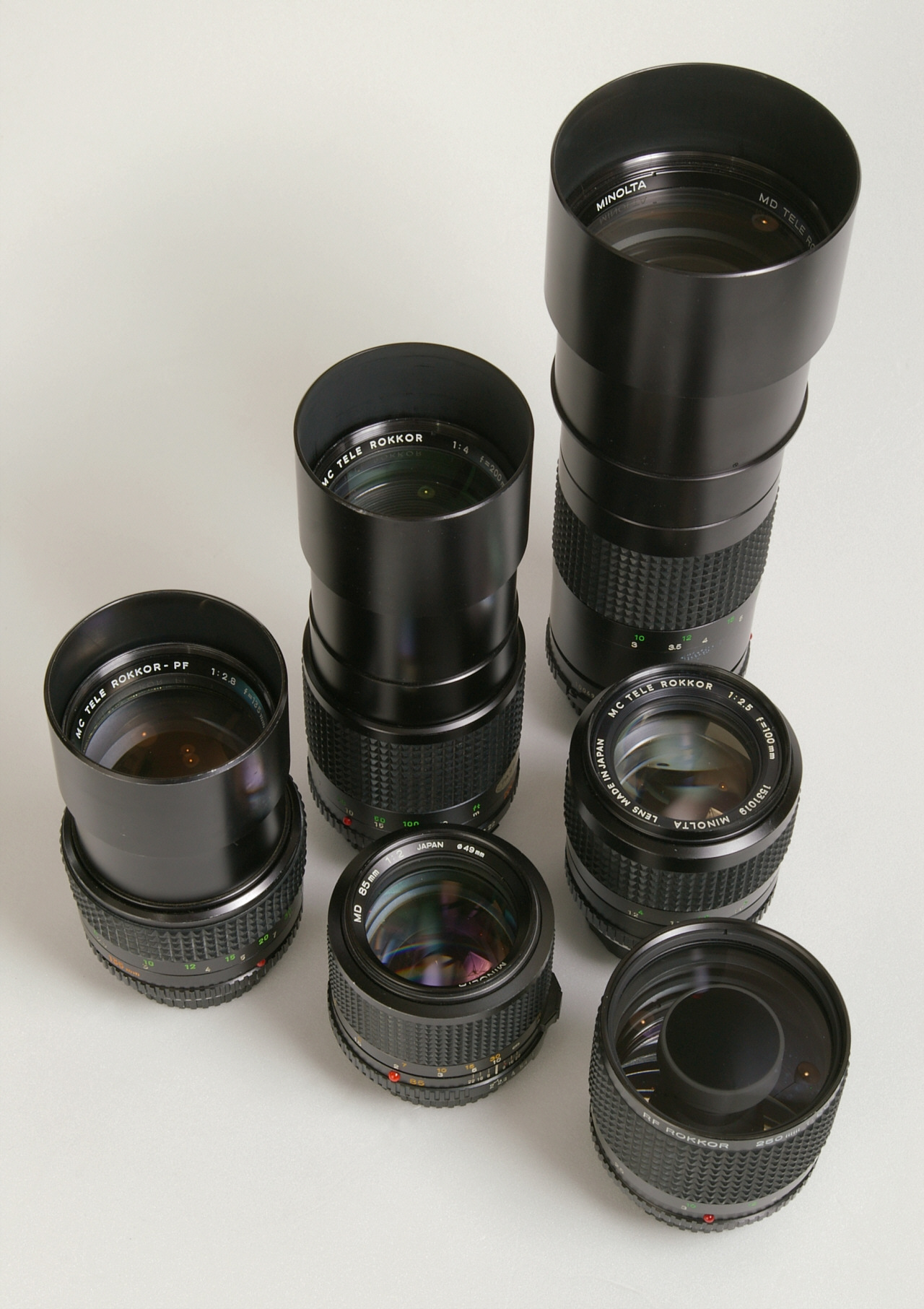
Some Minolta Rokkor tele photo lenses

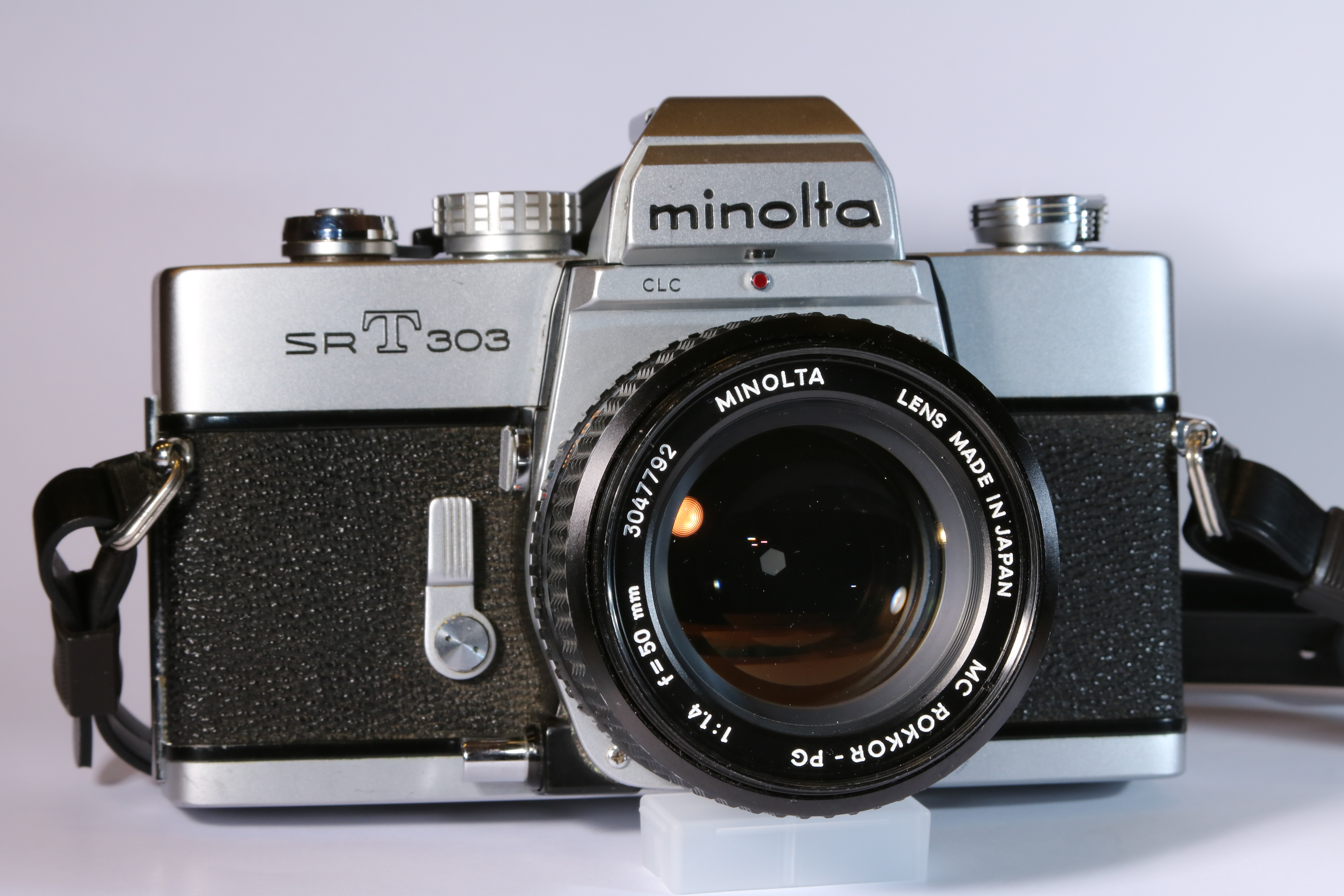
Minolta SR-T 303 camera with MC Rokkor-PG 50 mm 1:1.4 lens.

Rokkor was a brand name used for all Chiyoda Kōgaku Seikō and later Minolta lenses between 1940 and 1980, including a few which were marketed and sold by other companies like Leica. The name was derived from the name of Rokkō (六甲山), a 932 metres (3,058 ft) high mountain, which could be seen from the company's glass-making and optics factory at Mukogawa near Osaka, Japan. The company's founder Kazuo Tashima wanted the name to symbolize the high quality in optics.

== Overview ==
The first lens to carry the Rokkor designation was a 200mm f/4.5 lens that came with the hand-holdable aerial camera Chiyoda SK-100 in 1940. After the Rokkor name was dropped and no longer engraved in new lenses after 1980/1981, the Rokkor name resurfaced two times. As was revealed not before 2006, the Rokkor name was still used internally for prototypes of a never released SR-mount Minolta MD Apo Tele Rokkor 300mm f/2.8 manual-focus lens in the early 1980s, a lens design, which later saw life as the A-mount Minolta AF Apo Tele 300mm f/2.8 G in 1985, a non-Rokkor auto-focus lens. The Rokkor name was also resurrected for a short time between 1996 and 1998 for the Minolta G-Rokkor 28mm f/3.5 lens. As the only officially released auto-focus Rokkor ever, this lens was incorporated into the Minolta TC-1 135 film compact camera. To celebrate Minolta's 70th anniversary in 1998, the same optics were also used in the Minolta TC-1 Limited as well as in a Leica thread-mount version of the lens in a limited production run of 2000 units for the Japanese market only.

When the brand was still used by Minolta, there were also printed Minolta magazines named "ROKKOR" in Austria and Japan.

The brand was so well respected among photographers that some customers asked for "Rokkor cameras" and questioned the origin of the lenses when the first Minolta lenses without the Rokkor designation hit the market between 1977 and 1980. Many continued to call at least the manual-focus Minolta SR-mount lenses "Rokkors" long after the name was dropped. Even decades later, when Sony took over the A-mount auto-focus SLR system from Konica Minolta in 2006, for which no Rokkor lenses were ever produced, there were (unsuccessful) petitions to reintroduce the old Rokkor brand. There are now even totally unrelated pseudo-brands named Rokunar and Rokinon trying to capitalize on the power of Minolta's brand.

Rokkor suffix coding (pre-1975)
Elements Groups			3	4	5	6	7	8	9	10	11	12
Elements Groups			C	D	E	F	G	H	I	J	K	L
3	(trēs)	T	-TC (100, 135)	-TD (45, 300)	—							
4	(quattuor)	Q	—	-QD (135, 300)	-QE (35, 100, 200)	-QF (50, 200, 250)	—	-QH (21)	—			
5	(penta)	P	—		-PE (200)	-PF (50, 53, 55, 58, 85, 100, 135)	-PG (18, 50, 58, 135)	—	-PI (21)	—		
6	(hexa)	H	—			-HF (300)	-HG (35)	-HH (35)	—			
7	(septem)	S	—				-SG (28)	—	-SI (28)	—		
8	(octō)	O	—								-OK (16)	—
9	(novem)	N	—									-NL (21)

For some while in the 1960s and 1970s SR-mount SLR lenses manufactured for the North American market were engraved with Rokkor-X rather than just Rokkor (as was used in the rest of the world) in order to improve trackability and dry out the gray market. Although some buyers from the US and Europe each associated either the Rokkor-X or the non-X-ed Rokkor designation with a higher quality, respectively, both types of lenses were built to exactly the same specifications and quality standards in the factory. They differed only in their name plate. In the 1980s and 1990s, Minolta used a similar scheme for A-mount lenses, which were labelled Maxxum AF in the US and Canada (where the A-mount camera bodies were labelled Maxxum) and just AF elsewhere (including in those regions otherwise using the Dynax and α labels for the cameras).

Until around 1975, the Rokkor (or Rokkor-X) name was followed by a two-letter combination indicating the optical formula of the lens. The first letter stood for the number of groups, while the second letter indicated the number of elements; for example, a Rokkor-QF was a six element lens with four groups.

== Specialist types of Rokkor lenses ==
- E.Rokkor - lenses for enlargers with Leica thread-mount
- C.E.Rokkor/C.E.Rokkor-X - lenses for color enlargers with Leica thread-mount
- F.Rokkor - for fax machines or copiers?
- R.Rokkor - for microfiche / repro systems?
- W.Rokkor/W.Rokkor-X - Wide-angle lenses with SR-mount
- UW.Rokkor - Ultra-wide angle lenses with SR-mount
- P-Rokkor - slide projection lenses
- G-Rokkor - a combination of Minolta's "G" (gold) designation for high-end lenses and the Rokkor brand, the only lens to carry this designation is the Minolta G-Rokkor 28mm f/3.5 in the TC-1 as well as with Leica thread-mount
- M-Rokkor - lenses for the Minolta/Leica M-mount

Super Rokkor, Boen Rokkor, Fish-Eye Rokkor, VFC Rokkor, Shift CA Rokkor, Varisoft Rokkor, Bellows Micro Rokkor, Micro Rokkor, Bellows Macro Rokkor, Macro Rokkor, Tele Rokkor, RF Rokkor, Zoom Rokkor, Rokkor-TC, Rokkor-TD, TV Zoom Rokkor.

== List of Rokkor lenses for 35mm cameras ==
Interchangeable Rokkor lenses for 35mm SLR cameras
FL (mm)	Aperture	Name	SR (Note: Original line of lenses for Minolta SR mount)	MC (Note: Meter-Coupled mount, includes cosmetic variant "MC Rokkor-X", which moved to a rubber focusing ring instead of scalloped metal focusing rings.)	MD (Note: Adds minimum aperture signaling lever for shutter-priority autoexposure.)	Construction		Focus	Notes
FL (mm)	Aperture	Name	SR	MC	MD	Ele	Grp	Focus	Notes
Fisheye lenses
7.5	f/4–22	Fish-eye Rokkor	No	Yes	Yes	12	8	0.5 m (1 ft 8 in)	circular fisheye lens
16	f/2.8–16	Fish-eye Rokkor-OK	No	Yes	Yes	11	8	0.3 m (1 ft 0 in)	"full-frame" (diagonal) fisheye lens
18	f/9.5–22	UV Rokkor-PG	Yes	No	No	7	5	fixed	"full-frame" (diagonal) fisheye lens
Ultra wide angle lenses
17	f/4–16	W Rokkor	No	Yes	Yes	12	9	0.25 m (9.8 in)	Retrofocus design
20	f/2.8–22	W Rokkor	No	No	Yes	10	9	0.25 m (9.8 in)	Retrofocus design with floating element
21	f/2.8–16	W Rokkor-NL	No	Yes	No	12	9	0.25 m (9.8 in)	Retrofocus design
21	f/4–16	W Rokkor-QH	Yes	No	No	8	4	0.9 m (2 ft 11 in)	symmetric lens, requires mirror lock-up
21	f/4.5–16	W Rokkor-PI	Yes	No	No	9	5	0.9 m (2 ft 11 in)	symmetric lens, requires mirror lock-up
Wide angle lenses
24	f/2.8-16	W Rokkor	No	Yes	Yes	9	7	0.3 m (1 ft 0 in)	Retrofocus design
24	f/2.8-16	W Rokkor VFC	No	Yes	Yes	9	7	0.3 m (1 ft 0 in)	Retrofocus design
28	f/2–16	W Rokkor	No	Yes	Yes	10	9	0.3 m (1 ft 0 in)	Retrofocus design
28	f/2.5–16	W Rokkor-SI	No	Yes	No	9	7	0.5 m (1 ft 8 in)	Retrofocus design
28	f/2.8–16	W Rokkor	No	Yes	Yes	7	7	0.3 m (1 ft 0 in)	Retrofocus design
28	f/3.5–16	W Rokkor-SG	Yes	Yes	No	7	7	0.6 m (2 ft 0 in)	Retrofocus design
28	f/3.5–16	W Rokkor-PE	No	Yes	Yes	5	5	0.3 m (1 ft 0 in)	Retrofocus design
35	f/1.8–16	W Rokkor-HH	No	Yes	Yes	8	6	0.3 m (1 ft 0 in)	Retrofocus design
35	f/2.8–16	W Rokkor-HG	Yes	Yes	No	7	6	0.4 m (1 ft 4 in)	Retrofocus design
35	f/2.8–16	W Rokkor	No	Yes	Yes	5	5	0.3 m (1 ft 0 in)	Retrofocus design
35	f/2.8–22	Shift CA Rokkor	No	Yes	Yes	9	7	0.3 m (1 ft 0 in)	Retrofocus design, includes variable field curvature control (VFC)
35	f/4–22	W Rokkor-QE	Yes	No	No	5	4	0.4 m (1 ft 4 in)	Retrofocus design
Normal lenses
45	f/2.8–16	Rokkor-TD	Yes	No	No	4	3	0.9 m (2 ft 11 in)	
50	f/1.2–16	Rokkor	No	No	Yes	7	6	0.45 m (1 ft 6 in)	
50	f/1.4–16	Rokkor	No	Yes	Yes	7	5	0.5 m (1 ft 8 in)	
50	f/1.4–16	Rokkor	No	No	Yes	7	6	0.45 m (1 ft 6 in)	
50	f/1.7–16	Rokkor-PF	No	Yes	Yes	6	5	0.5 m (1 ft 8 in)	
50	f/1.7–16	Rokkor	No	No	Yes	6	5	0.45 m (1 ft 6 in)	
50	f/2–16	Rokkor	No	Yes	Yes	6	5	0.5 m (1 ft 8 in)	
50	f/3.5–22	Macro Rokkor-QF	Yes	Yes	Yes	6	4	0.23 m (9.1 in)	
53	f/2–16	Rokkor-PF	Yes	No	No	6	5	0.5 m (1 ft 8 in)	
55	f/1.7–16/22	Rokkor-PF	No	Yes	No	6	5	0.5 m (1 ft 8 in)	multiple versions with different minimum aperture
55	f/1.9–16	Rokkor	No	Yes	No	6	5	0.45 m (1 ft 6 in)	
55	f/1.8–16/22	Rokkor-PF	Yes	No	No	6	5	0.5 m (1 ft 8 in)	multiple versions with different minimum aperture
55	f/2–16/22	Rokkor-PF	Yes	No	No	6	5	0.5 m (1 ft 8 in)	multiple versions with different minimum aperture
58	f/1.2–16	Rokkor-PG	No	Yes	No	7	5	0.6 m (2 ft 0 in)	
58	f/1.4–16	Rokkor-PF	Yes	Yes	No	6	5	0.6 m (2 ft 0 in)	
Portrait lenses
85	f/1.7–22	Tele Rokkor-PF	No	Yes	No	6	5	1 m (3 ft 3 in)	
85	f/2–22	Rokkor	No	No	Yes	6	5	0.85 m (2 ft 9 in)	
85	f/2.8–16	Varisoft Rokkor	No	No	Yes	6	5	0.8 m (2 ft 7 in)	
100	f/2–22	Tele Rokkor-PF	Yes	Yes	No	6	5	1.2 m (3 ft 11 in)	
100	f/2.5–22	Tele Rokkor-PF	No	Yes	No	6	5	1.2 m (3 ft 11 in)	
100	f/2.5–22	Tele Rokkor-PE	No	Yes	Yes	5	5	1 m (3 ft 3 in)	
100	f/3.5–22	Tele Rokkor-QE	Yes	Yes	No	5	4	1.2 m (3 ft 11 in)	
100	f/3.5–22	Macro Rokkor-QE	No	Yes	Yes	5	4	0.45 m (1 ft 6 in)	
100	f/4–32	Macro Rokkor	No	No	Yes	5	4	0.45 m (1 ft 6 in)	
100	f/4–22	Tele Rokkor-TC	Yes	No	No	3	3	1.2 m (3 ft 11 in)	preset aperture
135	f/2–22	Rokkor	No	No	Yes	6	5	1.3 m (4 ft 3 in)	
135	f/2.8–22	Tele Rokkor-PF	Yes	Yes	No	6	5	1.5 m (4 ft 11 in)	
135	f/2.8–22	Tele Rokkor-PG	Yes	No	No	7	5	1.2 m (3 ft 11 in)	
135	f/2.8–22	Tele Rokkor-QD	No	Yes	Yes	4	4	1.5 m (4 ft 11 in)	
135	f/2.8–22	Rokkor	No	No	Yes	5	5	1.5 m (4 ft 11 in)	
135	f/3.5–22	Tele Rokkor-QD	No	Yes	Yes	4	4	1.5 m (4 ft 11 in)	
135	f/3.5–22	Rokkor	No	No	Yes	5	5	1.5 m (4 ft 11 in)	
135	f/4–22	Tele Rokkor-TC	Yes	No	No	3	3	1.5 m (4 ft 11 in)	preset aperture
Telephoto lenses
180	f/2.5–22	Tele Rokkor-PF	Yes	No	No	6	5	2.5 m (8 ft 2 in)	preset aperture
200	f/2.8–32	Rokkor	No	No	Yes	5	5	1.8 m (5 ft 11 in)	
200	f/3.5–22	Tele Rokkor-QF	Yes	Yes	No	6	4	2.5 m (8 ft 2 in)	
200	f/4–22	Tele Rokkor	No	Yes	Yes	5	5	2.5 m (8 ft 2 in)	
200	f/4.5–22	Tele Rokkor-PE	No	Yes	No	5	5	2.5 m (8 ft 2 in)	
200	f/5–22	Tele Rokkor-QE	Yes	No	No	5	4	5.5 m (18 ft)	preset aperture
250	f/4–22	Tele Rokkor-QF	Yes	No	No	6	4	3 m (9.8 ft)	preset aperture
250	f/5.6	Rokkor RF	No	No	Yes	6	5	2.5 m (8 ft 2 in)	catadioptric
300	f/4.5–32	Tele Rokkor-TD	Yes	No	No	4	3	4.5 m (15 ft)	preset aperture
300	f/4.5–32	Tele Rokkor-QD	Yes	No	No	4	4	4.5 m (15 ft)	preset aperture
300	f/4.5–22	Tele Rokkor-HF	No	Yes	No	6	6	4.5 m (15 ft)	
300	f/4.5–32	Rokkor	No	No	Yes	7	6	3 m (9.8 ft)	
300	f/5.6–32	Tele Rokkor-QD	Yes	No	No	4	4	4.5 m (15 ft)	preset aperture
300	f/5.6–22	Tele Rokkor-PE	No	Yes	Yes	5	5	4.5 m (15 ft)	
400	f/5.6–22	APO Tele Rokkor-PE	No	Yes	Yes	7	6	5 m (16 ft)	
500	f/8	RF Rokkor	No	No	Yes	6	5	4 m (13 ft)	catadioptric
600	f/5.6–45	Tele Rokkor-TD	Yes	No	No	4	3	10 m (33 ft)	preset aperture
600	f/6.3–32	APO Tele Rokkor	No	No	Yes	9	8	5 m (16 ft)	
800	f/8	RF Rokkor	No	Yes	Yes	8	7	8 m (26 ft)	catadioptric
1000	f/6.3	RF Rokkor	Yes	Yes	No	7	6	30 m (98 ft)	catadioptric
1600	f/11	RF Rokkor	No	Yes	No	7	6	21 m (69 ft)	catadioptric
1600	f/11	RF Rokkor	No	No	Yes	6	5	20 m (66 ft)	catadioptric
Zoom lenses
24-35	f/3.5–22	Zoom Rokkor	No	No	Yes	10	10	0.73 m (2 ft 5 in)	
24-50	f/4–22	Zoom Rokkor	No	No	Yes	13	11	0.7 m (2 ft 4 in)	
28-70	f/3.5(4.8)–22	Zoom Rokkor	No	No	Yes	8	8	0.8 m (2 ft 7 in)	In partnership with Cosina
28-85	f/3.5(4.5)–22	Zoom Rokkor	No	No	Yes	13	10	0.8 m (2 ft 7 in)	In partnership with Tokina
35-70	f/3.5–22	Zoom Rokkor	No	No	Yes	8	7	1 m (3 ft 3 in)	
35-70	f/3.5(4.8)–22	Zoom Rokkor	No	No	Yes	7	7	0.5 m (1 ft 8 in)	In partnership with Cosina
35-105	f/3.5(4.5)–22	Zoom Rokkor	No	No	Yes	14	12	1.5 m (4 ft 11 in)	In partnership with Tokina
35-135	f/3.5(4.5)–22	Zoom Rokkor	No	No	Yes	14	12	1.5 m (4 ft 11 in)	In partnership with Tokina
40-80	f/2.8–22	Zoom Rokkor	No	Yes	Yes	12	12	1 m (3 ft 3 in)	
50-100	f/3.5–16	Zoom Rokkor	Yes	No	No	15	9	2 m (6 ft 7 in)	
50-135	f/3.5–22	Zoom Rokkor	No	No	Yes	12	10	1.5 m (4 ft 11 in)	
70-210	f/4–22	Zoom Rokkor	No	No	Yes	12	9	1.1 m (3 ft 7 in)	
70-210	f/4.5(5.6)–22	Zoom Rokkor	No	No	Yes	12	9	1.2 m (3 ft 11 in)	
70-300	f/4.5(5.8)–22	Zoom Rokkor	No	No	Yes	13	9	1.5 m (4 ft 11 in)	In partnership with Cosina
75-150	f/4–32	Zoom Rokkor	No	No	Yes	12	8	1.2 m (3 ft 11 in)	
75-200	f/4.5–22	Zoom Rokkor	No	No	Yes	15	13	1.2 m (3 ft 11 in)	
80-160	f/3.5–22	Zoom Rokkor	Yes	No	No	15	10	2.5 m (8 ft 2 in)	
80-200	f/4.5–22	Zoom Rokkor	No	Yes	Yes	14	10	1.8 m (5 ft 11 in)	
100-200	f/5.6–22	Zoom Rokkor	Yes	Yes	Yes	8	5	2.5 m (8 ft 2 in)	
100-300	f/5.6–32	Zoom Rokkor	No	No	Yes	13	10	1.5 m (4 ft 11 in)	In partnership with Tokina
100-300	f/5.6(6.7)–22	Zoom Rokkor	No	No	Yes	10	8	1.5 m (4 ft 11 in)	
100-500	f/8–32	Zoom Rokkor	No	Yes	Yes	16	10	2.5 m (8 ft 2 in)	
100-500	f/8–32	APO Tele Zoom Rokkor	No	No	Yes	16	11	2.5 m (8 ft 2 in)	
160-500	f/8–22	Zoom Rokkor	Yes	No	No	16	11	4.5 m (15 ft)	
Specialty (close-up) lenses
12.5	f/2–16	Bellows Micro Rokkor	No	No	Yes	4	4	—	
25	f/2.5–16	Bellows Micro Rokkor	No	No	Yes	6	4	—	
50	f/3.5–32	Auto Bellows Rokkor	No	No	Yes	3	3	—	
100	f/4–32	Bellows Rokkor-TC	No	Yes	Yes	3	3	—	
100	f/4–32	Auto Bellows Rokkor	No	No	Yes	5	4	—	
135	f/4–22	Bellows Rokkor-TC	Yes	No	No	3	3	—	

== See also ==
- Nikkor
- Fujinon
- Takumar
- Zuiko
- Yashinon
- Yashikor
