= Pentax FA 31mm Limited lens =

SMC Pentax-FA 31mm f/1.8 AL Limited
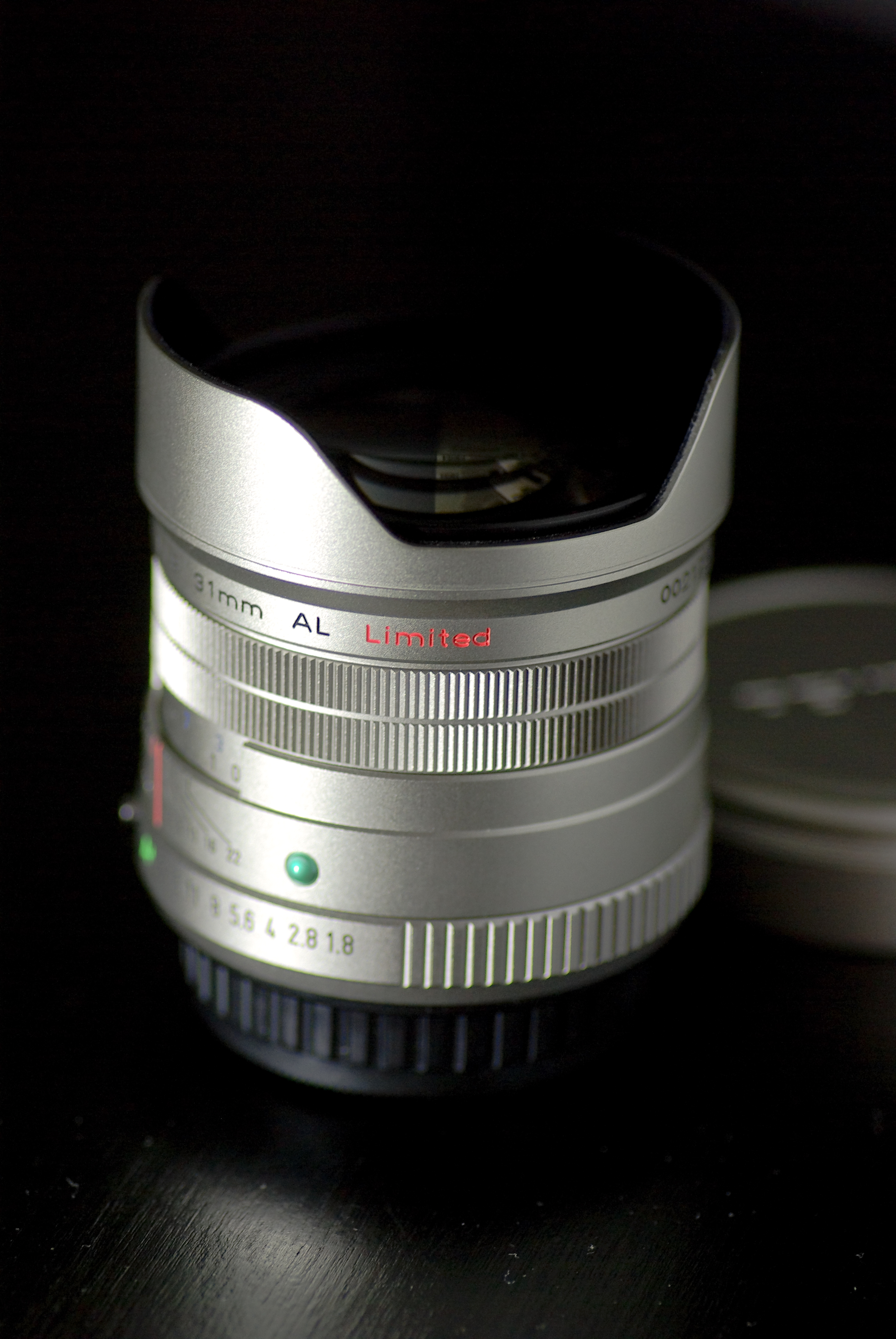
- Maker: Pentax

Technical data
- Type: Prime
- Focus drive: Screwdrive
- Focal length: 31mm
- Focal length (35mm equiv.): 46.5mm
- Aperture (max/min): f/1.8 / f/22
- Close focus distance: 12 inches (30 cm)
- Max. magnification: 0.16x
- Diaphragm blades: 9
- Construction: 9 elements in 7 groups

Features
- Application: Normal lens (APS-C), Wide-angle lens (Full frame)

Physical
- Max. length: 2.7 inches (69 mm)
- Diameter: 2.6 inches (66 mm)
- Weight: 12.2 ounces (350 g)
- Filter diameter: 58mm

Accessories
- Lens hood: Built-in

Angle of view
- Diagonal: 70° (full frame), 50° (APS-C)

Retail info
- MSRP: 1,299.95 USD

The SMC Pentax-FA 31mm f/1.8 AL Limited is a full-frame moderate wide-angle lens for Pentax K-mount. On an APS-C camera, it gives a normal field of view. It lacks Quick Shift Focus, which is now found on most other Pentax lenses, and therefore does not allow manual focusing while in autofocus mode.

== History ==
The eventual design of this lens was the second major attempt. An earlier design by Jun Hirakawa of a smaller 31mm f/2.4 lens was rejected by management for being too "slow" (i.e. too narrow at maximum aperture), and so the f/1.8 version came to be developed by Takayuki Ito and Masayuki Murata.

== Reception ==
Popular Photography said in its March 2002 issue that the Pentax 31mm Limited was one of the greatest prime lenses they had ever tested. Photozone called it "an excellent lens", and ePhotozone noted, "If we compare this 31mm with Leica prices, then we have tremendous value for money". In a Pentax Lens Tournament held in 2014, the users of pentaxforums.com, one of the biggest Pentax-related online communities, voted the 31mm Limited to be the Greatest Normal Pentax lens as well as the Second Greatest Pentax Lens of All Time after the FA 77mm Limited.
