= Jun Hirakawa =

Japanese lens designer

Jun Hirakawa (平川純) is a Japanese lens designer best known for creating the Pentax FA 43mm Limited and FA 77mm Limited lenses during his time at Pentax.

Hirakawa said at the time that he regretted his "early retirement" from Pentax in 2010, around the time that Hoya acquired the company, and was subsequently hired by Tamron.

== List of credited lens designs ==
Hirakawa is credited with designing:

- DA 10-17mm f/3.5-4.5 Fisheye (co-developed with Takayuki Ito)
- DA 14mm f/2.8
- DA 40mm f/2.8 Limited (based on the smc PENTAX-M 1:2.8 40mm)
- DA 50-200 f/4-5.6
- smc DA 55-300mm F4-5.8 ED
- DA* 55mm f/1.4
- F 17-28mm f/3.5-4.5 Fisheye
- F 35-80mm f/4-5.6
- F* 600mm f/4
- FA 28-105mm f/4-5.6
- FA 28mm f/2.8 AL
- FA 28mm f/2.8 SOFT
- FA 35mm f/2
- FA 43mm Limited
- FA 70-200mm f/4-5.6
- FA 77mm Limited (based on the smc PENTAX-A* 1:1.4 85mm)
- FA* 24mm f/2
- FA* 80-200mm f/2.8
- FA* 85mm f/1.4
- FA* 600mm f/4
- Tamron SP 24-70mm f/2.8 (2011)
- Unreleased 31mm f/2.4 prototype for the FA Limited series
- Unreleased wide-angle (80mm on 6x7 or 65mm on 645) f/2.8 (1986)
- Unreleased 70-300mm f/4-5.8 (1987)
- Unreleased 100-400mm f/5.6 (1992, with Koichi Maruyama)
- Unreleased 400mm f/4.5 (1988)

Kind	Type	Focal length	Aperture	87	88	89	1990	91	92	93	94	95	96	97	98	99	2000	01	02	03	04	05	06	07	08	09	2010	11	12	13	14	15	16	17	18	19	2020	21	22	23	24	25
Prime	UWA	14	2.8																		DA 14mm f/2.8 ED AL																					
Prime	UWA	15	4.0																							DA 15mm f/4 Limited				HD DA 15mm f/4 ED AL Limited												
Prime	UWA	20	2.8									FA 20mm f/2.8 AL																														
Prime	UWA	21	2.4																																			HD D FA 21mm Limited DC				
Prime	UWA	21	3.2																				DA 21mm f/3.2 AL Limited								HD DA 21mm f/3.2 AL Limited											
Prime	WA	24	2.0					FA* 24mm f/2 AL																																		
Prime	WA	31	1.8															FA 31mm f/1.8 Limited																				HD FA 31mm 1.8 Limited				
Prime	WA	35	2.0													FA 35mm f/2 AL																				HD FA 35mm f/2 WR						
Prime	WA	35	2.4																								DA 35mm f/2.4 AL															
Prime	WA	35	2.8																							DA 35mm f/2.8 Limited Macro					HD DA 35mm f/2.8 Limited Macro											
Prime	normal	40	2.8																		DA 40mm f/2.8 Limited									HD DA 40mm f/2.8 Limited												
Prime	normal	40	2.8																										DA 40mm f/2.8 XS													
Prime	normal	43	1.9											FA 43mm f/1.9 Limited																								HD FA 43mm 1.9 Limited				
Prime	normal	50	1.4	F 50mm f/1.4				FA 50mm f/1.4																																Classic		
Prime	normal	50	1.4																																					HD FA		
Prime	normal	50	1.4																																HD FA* 50 f/1.4 SDM AW							
Prime	normal	50	1.8																										DA 50mm f/1.8 AL													
Prime	normal	50	2.8		F 50 Macro		FA 50mm f/2.8 Macro															D FA 50mm f/2.8 Macro																				
Prime	normal	55	1.4																						DA* 55mm f/1.4 SDM																	
Prime	Short Tele	70	2.4																				DA 70mm f/2.4 Limited								HD DA 70mm f/2.4 Limited											
Prime	Short Tele	77	1.8													FA 77mm f/1.8 Limited																						HD FA 77mm 1.8 Limited				
Prime	Short Tele	85	1.4						FA* 85mm f/1.4																													HD D FA* 85mm 1.4 SDM AW				
Prime	Tele	100	2.8	F 100mm f/2.8 Macro				FA 100mm f/2.8 Macro													D FA 100mm f/2.8 Macro					D FA 2.8 Macro Macro WR														HD D FA AW		
Prime	Tele	135	2.8	F 135mm 2.8					FA 135mm 2.8																																	
Prime	Tele	200	2.8							FA* 200mm f/2.8 ED															DA* 200mm f/2.8 SDM																	
Prime	4.0	200														FA* 200mm f/4 Macro ED																										
Prime	Super tele	300	2.8								FA* 300mm f/2.8 ED																															
Prime	Super tele	300	4.x	F* 300mm f/4.5 ED				FA* 300mm f/4.5 ED																	DA* 300mm f/4 SDM																	
Prime	Super tele	400	5.6											FA* 400mm f/5.6 ED																												
Prime	Ultra tele	560	5.6																										HD DA 560mm f/5.6 ED AW													
Prime	Ultra tele	600	4.0		F* 600mm f/4 ED			FA* 600mm f/4 ED																																		
Zoom	Fisheye		3.5-4.5									F 17-28mm f/3.5-4.5 Fish-Eye														DA 10-17mm f/3.5-4.5 Fish-Eye											HD DA 10-17mm 3.5-4.5 Fish-Eye					
Zoom	UWA	11-18	2.8																																	HD DA* 11-18 f/2.8 ED DC AW						
Zoom	UWA	12-24	4.0																			DA 12-24mm f/4 ED AL																				
Zoom	UWA	15-30	2.8																														D FA 15-30mm f/2.8 ED SDM WR									
Zoom	UWA	20-35	4.0												FA 20-40mm f/4 AL																											
Zoom	WA	16-45	4.0																	DA 16-45mm 4 ED AL																						
Zoom	WA	16-50	2.8																					DA* 16-50mm f/2.8 ED AL SDM														HD DA* 2.8 ED PLM AW				
Zoom	WA	16-85	3.5-5.6																												HD DA 16-85mm f/3.5-5.6 ED DC WR											
Zoom	WA	18-50	4-5.6																													HD DA 18-50 f/4-5.6 DC WR RE										
Zoom	WA	18-135	3.5-5.6																								DA 18-135mm f/3.5-5.6 ED AL DC WR															
Zoom	WA	20-40	2.8-4																												HD DA 20-40mm f/2.8-4 Limited DC WR											
Zoom	WA	24-50	4.0	F 24-50mm f/4																																						
Zoom	WA	24/28-70	2.8								FA* 28-70mm f/2.8 AL																						D FA 24-70mm f/2.8									
Zoom	Univ.	28-80	3.5-4.7					FA 28-80 f/3.5-4.7																																		
Zoom	Univ.	28-105	3.5/4-5.6						FA 28-105 f/4-5.6																									D FA 28-105 f/3.5-5.6 ED DC WR								
Zoom	Tele	50-135	2.8																					DA* 50-135mm f/2.8 ED SDM																		
Zoom	Tele	50-200	4-5.6																			DA 50-200mm f/4-5.6 ED				DA 50-200mm f/4-5.8 ED WR																
Zoom	Tele	55-300	4-5.8																						DA 55-300mm f/4-5.8 ED					DA 55-300mm f/4-5.8 ED WR												
Zoom	Tele	55-300	4.5-6.3																														HD DA 55-300mm f/4.5-6.3 ED PLM WR RE									
Zoom	Tele	60-250	4.0																						DA* 60-250mm f/4 ED SDM																	
Zoom	Tele	70/80-2x0	2.8								FA* 80-200mm f/2.8 ED																						HD D FA* 70-200mm f/2.8 ED DC AW									
Zoom	Tele	70/80-2x0	4.0																																		HD D FA 70-210 4 ED SDM WR					
Zoom	Tele	70/80-2x0	4-5.6	F 70-210mm f/4-5.6							FA 70-200mm f/4-5.6 ED																															
Zoom	Tele	100-300	4.5-5.6						FA 100-300mm f/4.5-5.6																																	
Zoom	Tele	150-450	4.5-5.6																														D FA 150-450mm f/4.5-5.6 ED DC AW									
Zoom	Tele	250-600	5.6		F* 250-600 ED			FA* 250-600 f/5.6 ED																																		
Teleconverter				F 1.7X AF																											HD DA 1.4X AW											
Kind	Type	Focal length	Aperture	87	88	89	1990	91	92	93	94	95	96	97	98	99	2000	01	02	03	04	05	06	07	08	09	2010	11	12	13	14	15	16	17	18	19	2020	21	22	23	24	25
