= Tokina =

Japanese photographic lens and CCTV equipment manufacturer

Tokina Co., Ltd.
- Native name: 株式会社トキナ
- Romanized name: Tokina Co., Ltd.
- Type: Kabushiki Kaisha
- Industry: High-end optical devices and camera manufacturer
- Founded: January 1, 1950; 76 years ago in Japan
- Founder: Kawaguchi Denkichi
- Headquarters: Machida, Tokyo, Japan
- Website: www.tokina.co.jp

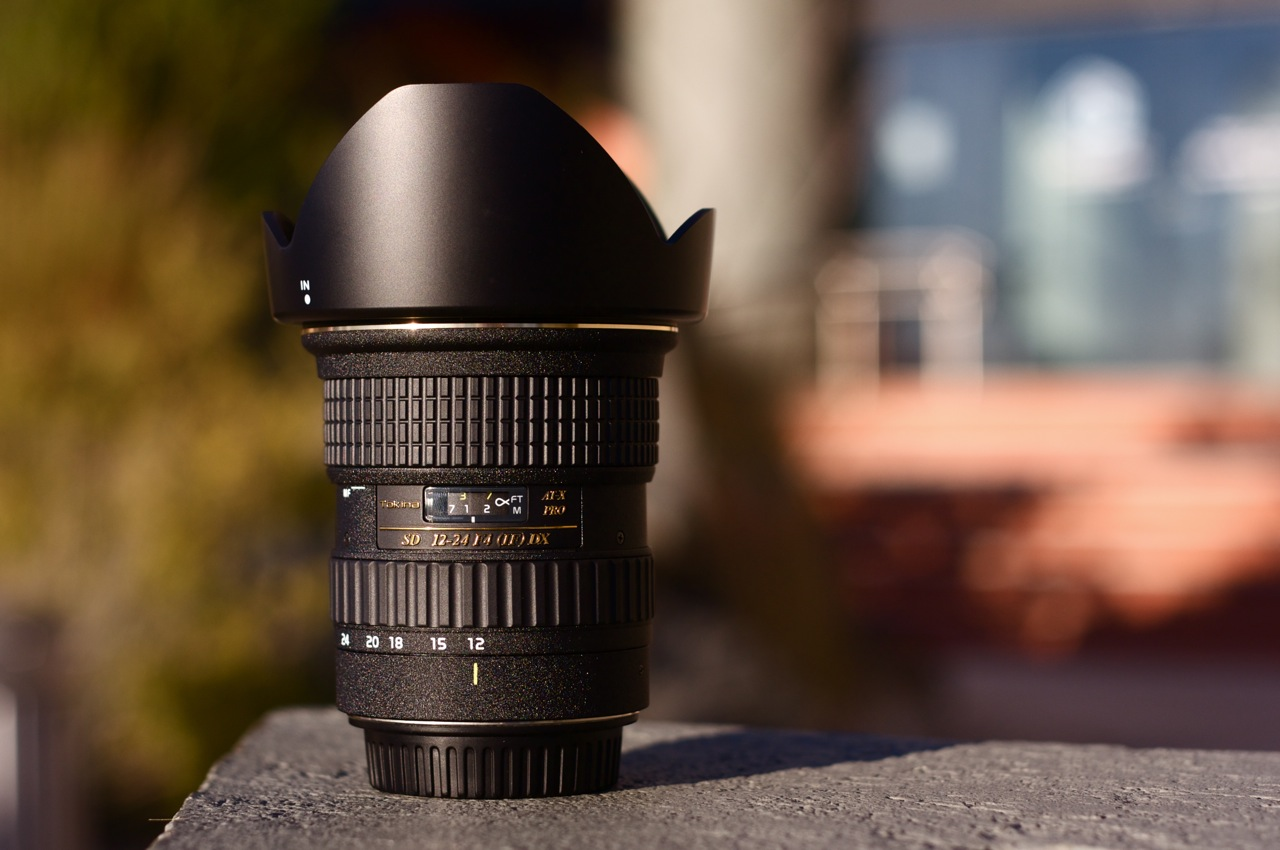
Tokina AT-X Pro 12–24 f/4.0 lens

Tokina Co., Ltd. (株式会社トキナー, Kabushiki-gaisha Tokinā) is a Japanese manufacturer of photographic lenses and CCTV security equipment. Established in 1950, the company has developed a reputation for producing high-quality optical products compatible with various camera brands.

== History ==
Tokina was founded in May 1950 in Shinjuku, Tokyo, as Tokyo Optical Equipment Manufacturing (Tokyo Koki Seisakusho) by Kawaguchi Denkichi.

In 1960, Tokina began producing its own lenses under the Tokina brand, establishing itself as a manufacturer of optical lenses for SLR cameras.The company’s first zoom lens, the 90–230mm f/4.5, was introduced in 1967.

In 1994, Tokina was absorbed by Kenko Co., Ltd., becoming a subsidiary and adopting the name Tokina Co., Ltd.

== Corporate structure ==
Tokina operates as a brand under Kenko Tokina Co., Ltd., a comprehensive optical manufacturer headquartered in Tokyo. Kenko Tokina’s product range includes binoculars, microscopes, filters, and various photographic and optical accessories.

== Lens designations ==
Tokina’s product lineup includes a range of lenses for DSLR and mirrorless cameras, as well as CCTV lenses. Notable lens series include:

- FX - Full frame
- DX - cropped digital
- AF - Auto-Focus
- AT-X Pro - professional line (constant aperture zooms or primes)
- AT-X - consumer line
- IF - Internal Focus System
- FE - Floating Element System
- NH - No Hood (10-17mm fisheye without built-in hood)

Optical design:

- AS - Aspherical Optics
- F&R - Advanced Aspherical Optics
- SD - Super Low Dispersion
- HLD - High-Refraction and Low Dispersion
- MC - Multi-Coating

In addition to photographic lenses, Tokina produces a variety of CCTV and machine vision lenses, including:

- Tele Zoom Cameras
- Autofocus Zoom Lenses
- SWIR Telephoto Lenses
- Machine Vision Lenses
- Scanner Lenses

== Lenses ==
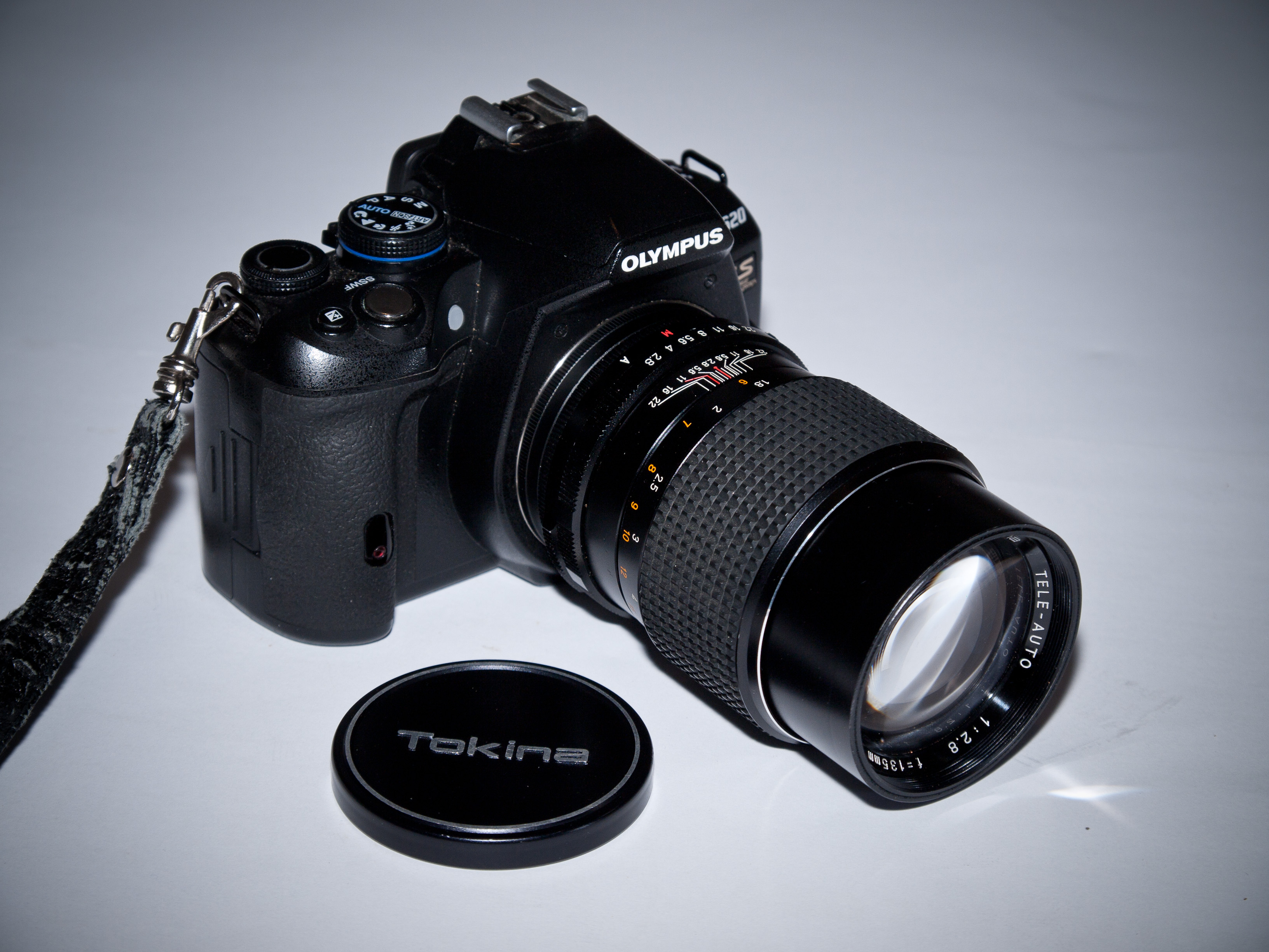
Tokina 135 mm f/2.8 lens on an Olympus Digital body

=== Zoom ===
- AT-X 107 DX AF fisheye 10–17 mm f/3.5–4.5 (available with and without the built-in hood. No hood version can be used on full-frame. The lens is also sold under Pentax brand.)
- AT-X 116 PRO DX AF 11–16 mm f/2.8
- AT-X PRO SD 11–20 mm f/2.8 (IF) DX
- AT-X 124 PRO DX AF 12–24 mm f/4 (The lens is also sold under Pentax brand)
- AT-X 124 PRO DX II SD IF AF 12–24 mm f/4
- AT-X PRO DX AF 12–28 mm f/4
- AT-X PRO FX AF 16–28 mm f/2.8
- AT-X 165 PRO DX AF 16–50 mm f/2.8 (The lens is also sold under Pentax brand)
- AT-X DX AF 16.5–135 mm f/3.5–5.6
- AT-X PRO FX AF 17–35 mm f/4
- AF 193 19–35 mm f/3.5–4.5 (made by Cosina)
- AT-X 235 PRO AF 20–35 mm f/2.8
- AF 235 20–35 mm f/3.5–4.5 (72 mm filter)
- AF 235 II 20–35 mm f/3.5–4.5 (77 mm filter)
- AT-X 240 AF 24–40 mm f/2.8
- AT-X 24–70 mm PRO FX f/2.8
- AT-X 242 AF 24–200 mm f/3.5–5.6
- RMC 25–50 mm f/4
- AT-X 270 PRO AF 28–70 mm f/2.6–2.8
- SZ-X 287 28–70 mm f/2.8–4.3
- AT-X 287 PRO SV AF 28–70 mm f/2.8
- AT-X AF 28–70 mm f/2.8
- AT-X 280 PRO AF 28–80 mm f/2.8
- SZ-X 270 SD 28–70 mm f/3.5–4.5
- AT-X 285 28–85 mm f/3.5–4.5
- AF 28-80 f/3.5–5.6
- SMZ 287 28–70 mm f/4
- RMC 28–85 mm f/4
- AT-X 235 28–135 mm f/4–4.6
- AT-X 357 35–70 mm f/2.8
- RMC 35–70 mm f/3.5
- RMC 35–105 mm f/3.5
- SMZ 35–105 mm f/3.5–4.3
- RMC 35–135 mm f/4–4.5
- AT-X 352 35–200 mm f/3.5–4.5
- AT-X SD 35–200 mm f/3.5–4.5
- AF 353 SD 35–300 mm f/4.5–6.7
- AT-X 535 PRO DX AF 50–135 mm f/2.8 (The lens is also sold under Pentax brand)
- EMZ 520 50–200 mm f/3.5–4.5
- AT-X 525 50–250 mm f/4–5.6
- AT-X 120 60–120 mm f/2.8
- AT-X PRO FX AF 70–200 mm f/4 VCM-S (image stabilization)
- RMC 70–210 mm f/3.5
- RMC 70–210 mm f/4
- RMC 70–220 mm f/3.5
- RMC 75–150 mm f/3.8
- SMZ 75 75–260 mm f/4.5
- AT-X SD 80–200 mm f/2.8
- AT-X 828 AF 80–200 mm f/2.8
- AT-X 828 PRO AF 80–200 mm f/2.8
- SMZ 835 80–200 mm f/3.5–4.5
- SZ 820 80–200 mm f/4.0
- RMC 80–200 mm f/4.0
- RMC 80–200 mmf/4.0
- SMZ 845 80–200 mm f/4.5
- RMC 80–250 mm f/4.5
- AT-X 840 AF 80–400 mm f/4.5–5.6
- AT-X 840 PRO D AF 80–400 mm f/4.5–5.6
- AT-X 100–300 mm SD f/4
- AT-X 340 AF 100–300 mm f/4
- AT-X 340 AF II 100–300 mm f/4
- RMC 100–300 mm f/5
- SZ 10 100–300 mm f/5.6
- AT-X 150–500 mm f/5.6
- SZ-X 205 28–105 mm f/4–5.3
- SZ-X SD 35–200 mm f/4–5.6
- SZ-X 210 SD 70–210 mm f/4–5.6
- SZ-X 820 80–200 mm f/4.5 (filter 55 mm)
- SZ-X 80–200 mm f/4.5–5.6 (filter 49 mm & 52 mm)
- RMC 90–230 mm f/4.5
- SZ-X 282 28–200 mm f/3.5–5.3 (filter 72mm)

=== Prime ===
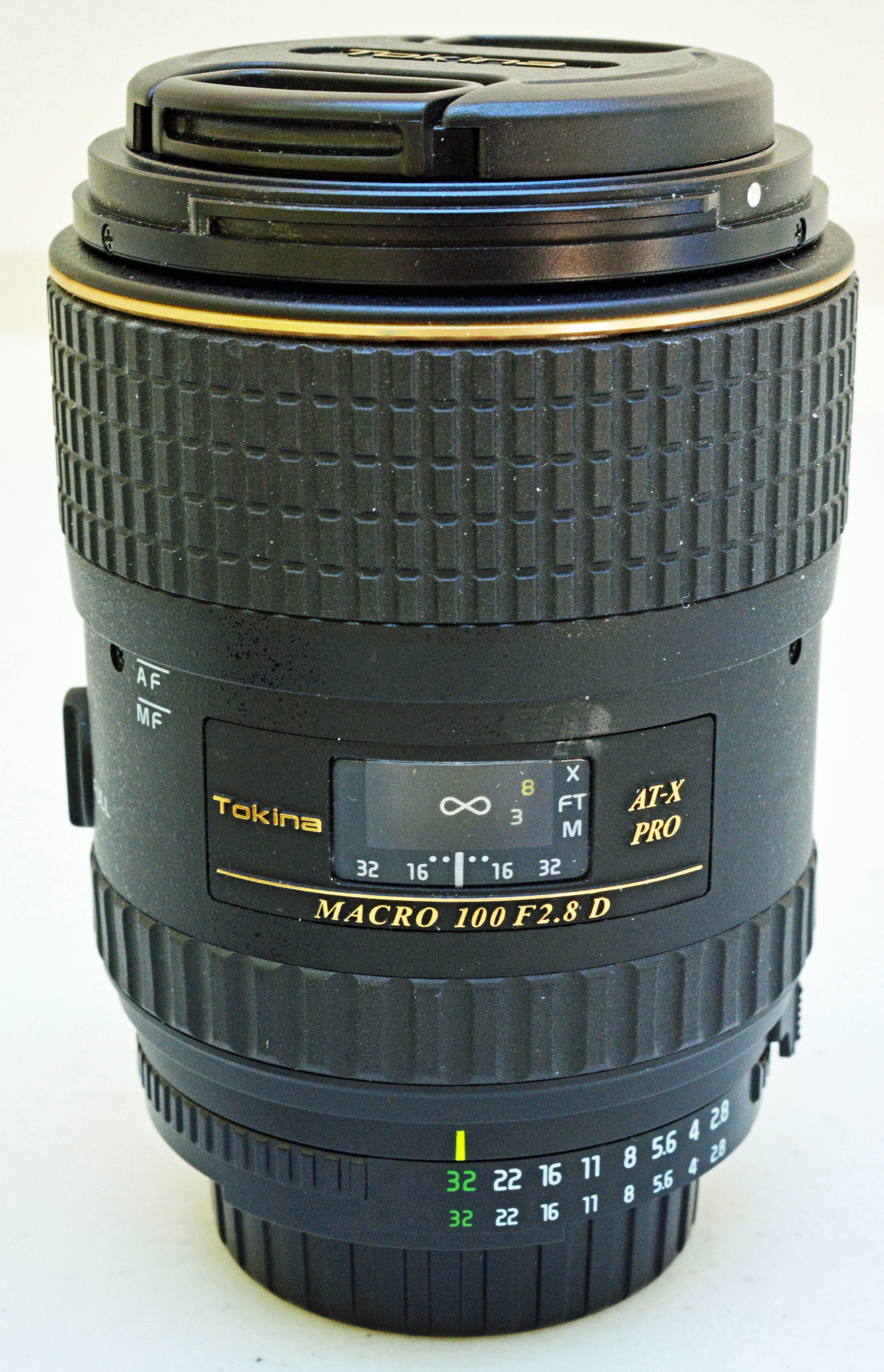
100 mm macro

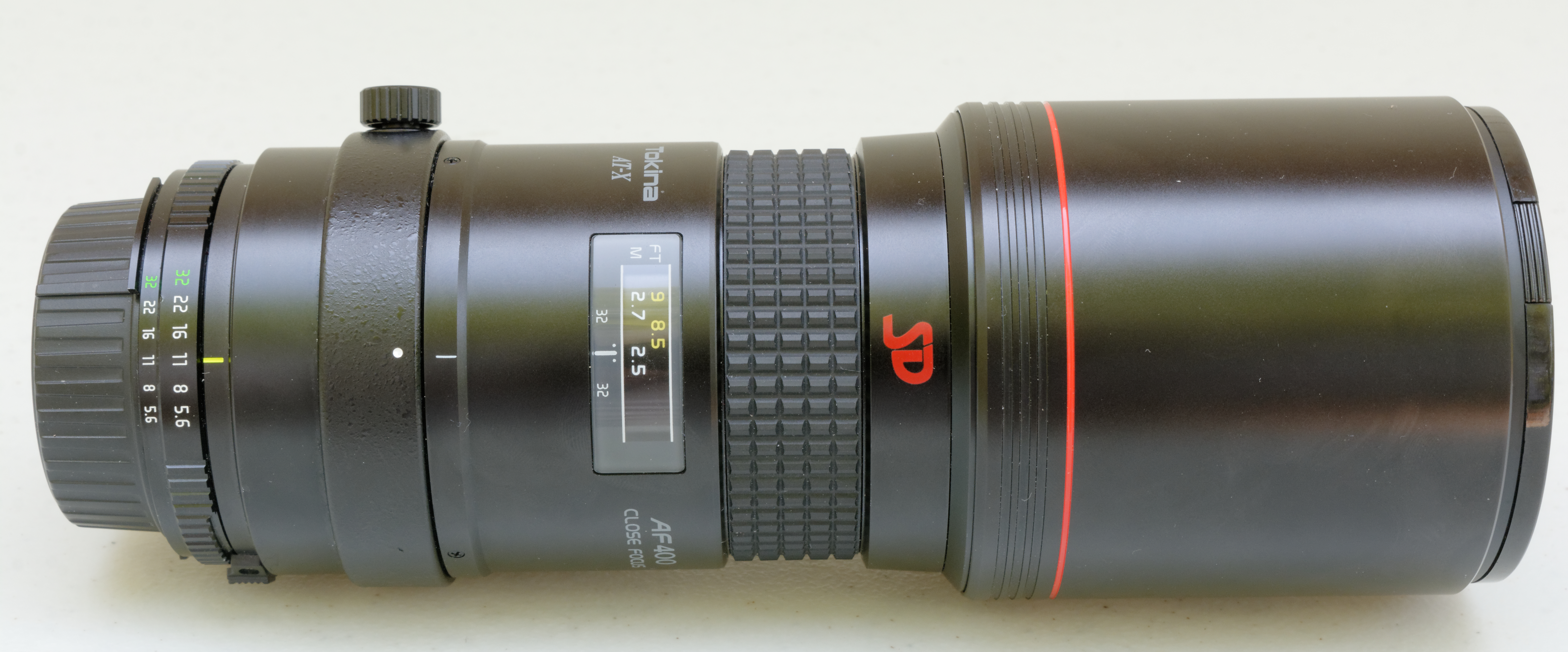
400 mm telephoto

- SL 17 17 mm f/3.5
- AT-X 17 AF 17 mm f/3.5
- AT-X 17 PRO AF 17 mm f/3.5
- RMC 17 17 mm f/3.5
- FiRIN 20 mm f/2.0 FE MF
- RMC 24 mm f/2.8
- SL 24 24 mm f/2.8
- RMC 28 mm f/2
- RMC 28 mm f/2.8
- SL 28 28 mm f/2.8
- AT-X M35 PRO DX AF 35 mm f/2.8 MACRO
- SL 35 35 mm f/2.8
- Opera 50 mm f/1.4
- AT-X M90 90 mm f/2.5 MACRO
- AT-X M100 AF 100 mm f/2.8 MACRO (internal focus, 1:2)
- AT-X M100 PRO D AF 100 mm f/2.8 MACRO
- SL 135 135 mm f/2.8
- SL 200 200 mm f/3.5
- AT-X 300 SD 300 mm f/2.8
- AT-X 300 AF II 300 mm f/2.8
- AT-X 300 PRO AF 300 mm f/2.8
- AT-X 304 AF 300 mm f/4
- 300 mm f/5.5 (preset T-mount)
- SL 300 300 mm f/5.6
- AT-X SD AF 400 mm f/5.6
- SL 400 400 mm f/5.6
- SL 400 SD 400 mm f/5.6
- 400 mm f/6.3 (preset T-mount)
- TM 500 500 mm f/8 Mirror
- T600 600 mm f/8 (preset, lens head & focus unit)
- T800 800 mm f/8 (preset, lens head & focus unit)

=== Borg ===
- 36ED EAA Tele Lens Set (3964)
- BORG 36ED Tele Lens Set II (6238)
- BORG 54 Tele Lens Set (6254)
- BORG 55FL + Reducer 7880 Set (6258)
- BORG 55FL EAA Tele Lens Set (3965)
- BORG 55FL Tele Lens Set II (6256)
- BORG 72FL Compact Tele Lens Set (6721)
- BORG 72FL Tele Lens Set CH (6720)
- BORG 90FL + Reducer 7872 Set (6572)
- BORG 90FL Tele Lens Set CH (6490)
- BORG 107FL Tele Lens Set CH (6210)

=== FiRIN ===
- FíRIN 100mm F2.8 FE MACRO
- FíRIN 20mm F2 FE AF
- FíRIN 20mm F2 FE MF

== See also ==
- List of photographic equipment makers
- List of Tokina lenses with Nikon F-mount and integrated autofocus motor
- Kenko (company) - produces lenses under the Tokina name
