= Eiichi Hosokawa =

Japanese industrialist

Eiichi Hosokawa was a Japanese industrialist and a pioneering inventor in the field of fine grinding mill technology. He is credited for inventing the "Micron mill" and is also known for founding Hosokawa Micron Corporation.

== Biography ==
Hosokawa was born in 1889, a time of Japan's rapid industrialization, in Tsuna-gun (now Sumoto-shi), Awaji Island, Hyogo Prefecture, Japan. He was educated under Japan's old system of education until he graduated from high school. He then completed a degree from the Nagoya Technical School. Hosokawa married Hatsu Osame, a sister of Gohei Osame, a specialist in the development of sulphuric acid manufacturing equipment.

=== Hosokawa Micron ===
In 1914, Hosokawa founded Hosokawa Turbine Water Mill Company, which manufactured water mills and pumps. Another source cited that the founding was April 18, 1916, and the company was headquartered in Osaka. He then invented the Hosokawa Micron mill in 1930 and founded the Hosokawa Ironworks. This machine was a type of air classifying mill (ACM) noted for its efficiency.

Since Eiichi was an engineer, he had little interest in business. It was only after his son Masuo joined the company that the business began to prosper.

Today, Hosokawa Micron is considered a world leader in fine powder processing equipment with an estimated 30 percent share in the global fine powder market. Eiichi Hosokawa's descendant, Kohei Hosokawa is currently the president and CEO of Hosokawa Micron Corporation.
