= Zeiss Loxia Distagon T* 2.8/21mm =

- Maker: Zeiss
- Lens mount(s): Sony E-mount

Technical data
- Type: Prime
- Focal length: 21mm
- Image format: 35mm full-frame
- Close focus distance: 0.25 metres (0.82 ft)
- Max. magnification: 0.13x
- Diaphragm blades: 10
- Construction: 11 elements in 9 groups

Features
- Manual focus override: Yes Yes
- Weather-sealing: Yes Yes
- Lens-based stabilization: No No
- Aperture ring: Yes Yes
- Unique features: Digital focus distance scale
- Application: Landscape, Architectural

Physical
- Max. length: 72 millimetres (2.8 in)
- Diameter: 62 millimetres (2.4 in)
- Weight: 394 grams (0.869 lb)
- Filter diameter: 52mm

Accessories
- Lens hood: Barrel-type, metal

History
- Introduction: 2015

Retail info
- MSRP: $1499 USD

The Zeiss Loxia Distagon T* 2/21mm is a full-frame (FE) wide-angle manual focus prime lens for the Sony E-mount, announced by Zeiss on October 12, 2015.

Though designed for Sony's full frame E-mount cameras, the lens can be used on Sony's APS-C E-mount camera bodies, with an equivalent full-frame field-of-view of 31.5mm.

== Build quality ==
The lens features a minimalist weather resistant metal construction with a matte black finish and an aperture de-click screw found at the bottom of the lens.

== Image Quality ==
The lens is exceptionally sharp from its maximum aperture of f/2.8 across the frame. Distortion and chromatic aberration are all well controlled. However, the lens suffers from moderate vignetting.

The lens also excels at low-light photography given its fast maximum aperture of f/2.8 and exceptional coma control. In addition, having a wide-angle field-of view allows for longer exposures to be taken of stars without the effect of star trails affecting the resultant image.

== See also ==
- List of third-party E-mount lenses
- Tokina FiRIN 20mm F2
- Zeiss Distagon
