= Tokina FiRIN 20mm F/2.0 FE MF =

Tokina Firin 20mm f/2.0 FE MF
- Maker: Tokina
- Lens mount(s): Sony E-mount

Technical data
- Type: Prime
- Focal length: 20mm
- Image format: 35mm full-frame
- Aperture (max/min): f/2.0 - 22.0
- Close focus distance: 0.28 metres (0.92 ft)
- Max. magnification: 0.10x
- Diaphragm blades: 9
- Construction: 13 elements in 11 groups

Features
- Manual focus override: Yes Yes
- Weather-sealing: No No
- Lens-based stabilization: No No
- Aperture ring: Yes Yes
- Unique features: Aperture ring can be de-clicked
- Application: Landscape, Street, Low-Light

Physical
- Max. length: 69 millimetres (2.7 in)
- Diameter: 62 millimetres (2.4 in)
- Weight: 490 grams (1.08 lb)
- Filter diameter: 62mm

Accessories
- Lens hood: None

History
- Introduction: 2017

Retail info
- MSRP: $799 USD

The Tokina Firin 20mm f/2.0 FE MF is a full-frame wide-angle manual focus lens for the Sony E-mount, announced by Tokina on September 8, 2016. It is the first in a new line of Tokina lenses optimized for Sony E-mount, and currently the only Tokina lens offered for Sony full-frame cameras.

Though designed for Sony's full frame E-mount cameras, the lens can be used on Sony's APS-C E-mount camera bodies, with an equivalent full-frame field-of-view of 30mm.

== Build quality ==
The lens features a solid aluminum body with a detachable cinema-style lens hood. The lens showcases a minimalist black exterior with an aperture de-click ring, aperture ring, and focus ring. Despite being a manual focus lens, the lens transmits full Exif data to the camera body.

== Image quality ==
The lens is very sharp from its maximum aperture of f/2, with only a slight fall-off in acuity toward the edges of the frame. Distortion and chromatic aberration are all well controlled. However, the lens suffers from mild vignetting.

The lens also excels at low-light photography given its fast maximum aperture of f/2.0 and exceptional coma control. In addition, having a wide-angle field-of view allows for longer exposures to be taken of stars without the effect of star trails affecting the resultant image.

== See also ==
- List of third-party E-mount lenses
- List of Sony E-mount lenses
- Zeiss Loxia 2.8/21mm
