= Pentax FA 77mm Limited lens =

Pentax smc FA 77mm 1.8 Limited
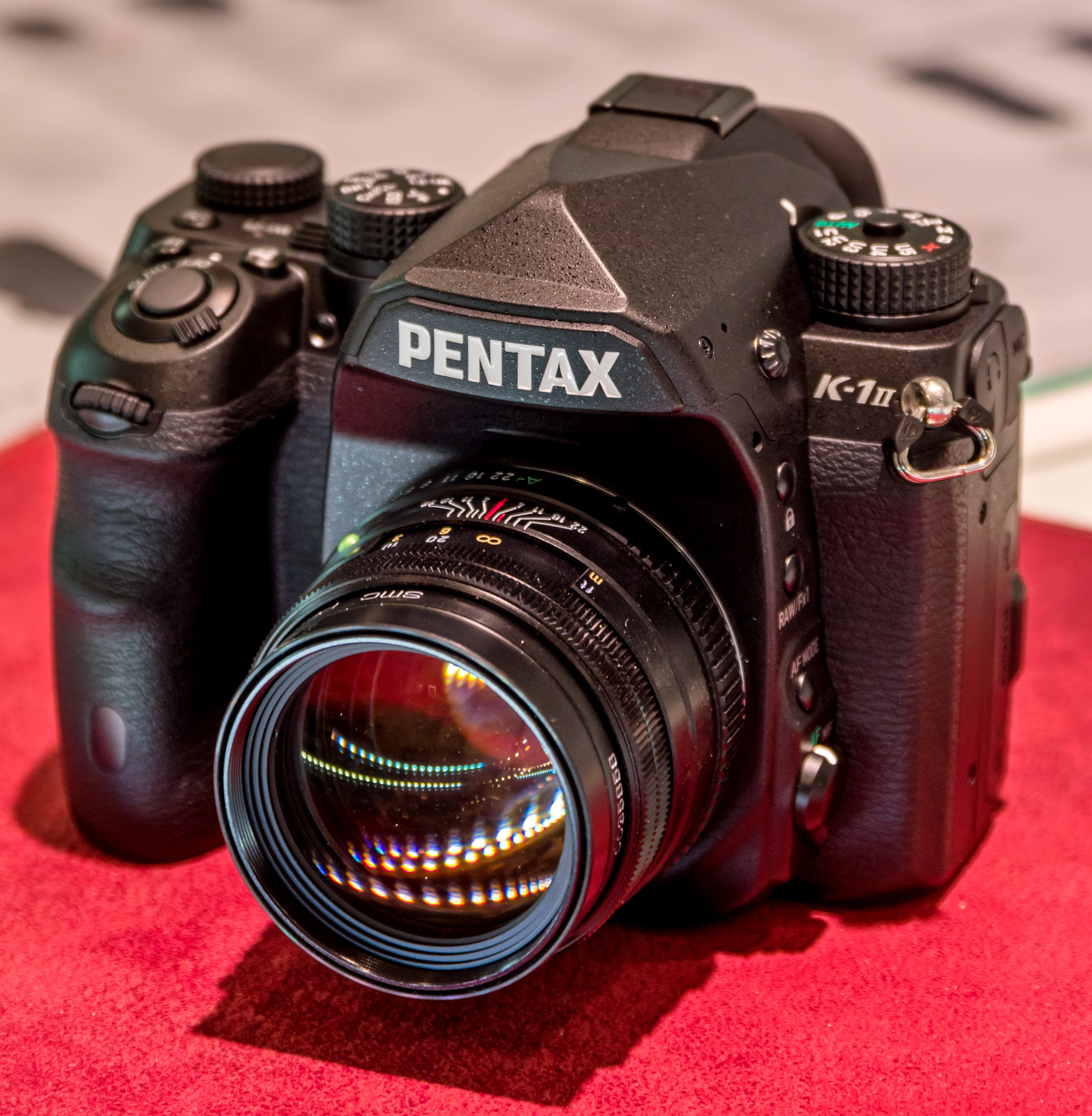
- FA 77mm mounted on a K-1II
- Maker: Pentax
- Lens mount: Pentax K

Technical data
- Type: Prime
- Focus drive: Screwdrive
- Focal length: 77mm
- Aperture (max/min): f/1.8
- Close focus distance: 0.70 metres (2.3 ft)
- Max. magnification: 0.14
- Diaphragm blades: 9
- Construction: 7 elements in 6 groups

Features
- Manual focus override: No No
- Weather-sealing: No No
- Lens-based stabilization: No No
- Aperture ring: Yes Yes

Physical
- Max. length: 48 millimetres (1.9 in)
- Diameter: 64 millimetres (2.5 in)
- Weight: 270 grams (0.60 lb)
- Filter diameter: 49mm

Accessories
- Lens hood: built in

The smc Pentax-FA 77mm f/1.8 Limited is a prime lens for Pentax K-mount aimed at portrait photography. It was voted "Greatest Pentax Lens of All Time" at Pentaxforums.com.

It is one of the three FA Limited lenses (the other two being the smc Pentax-FA 43mm f/1.9 Limited and smc Pentax-FA 31mm f/1.8 Limited) in Pentax lens line up. They share superbly machined aluminium construction, exclusively designed lens hoods and slip-on caps, a very comfortable to use depth of field scale, an emerald dot to line up with the lens release button on the camera (making it convenient to switch lenses in the dark) and excellent optical performance (especially at the time of launch.) These lenses are hand made and are available in black or silver finish.

== History ==
Pentax released the lens in 1999, two years after the FA 43mm Limited, the first lens in their Limited series. More than 20 years after its launch it is still in production, although, probably to maintain cost efficiency, manufacturing now takes place in one of Pentax' factories in Vietnam (before production was in their main factory in Tokyo.) As with the FA 43mm and FA 31 Limited, Mr Jun Hirokawa, an influential lens designer at Pentax, took charge of the optical design of the FA 77mm Limited. Building on the optical formula of the smc Pentax-A* 85mm f/1.4 he redesigned it to a more compact lens.

One famous account goes that the FA 43 Limited was a homebrew project of Hirokawa, developing the lens in his spare time. When the FA 43 Limited became popular (especially in its home country), he decided to develop two other lenses, one a short telephoto and the other a wide-angle. This story, however, is most certainly not true. According to Pentax itself, people at the company felt they should conceive a set of lenses with the quality and compactness to go with the newly proposed MZ-5 and MZ-3 film cameras. The sales department, however, was reluctant to go ahead with the project, as they were not sure they would sell well. Until then Pentax was known for their value-oriented offerings and was afraid customers wouldn't see the value of a set of small, yet expensive lenses. They decided to slow down the plan to release one lens at a time.

Since the FA 77mm Limited, as the second FA Limited lens had to be a compact portrait lens they decided against yet another 85mm. As Jun Hirakawa liked much the traditional Japanese cake made by the cake maker "喜月堂" who has a logo of the Chinese word "喜" writing similar to three seven "七" Chinese words, he simply thought about to design a 77mm lens.

The parts are machined manually. This process allowed the lenses to be released economically but subsequently prevented reducing costs as production scaled up.

== Design ==
The philosophy of the FA 77mm and its siblings differs from the usual practice applied when creating lenses. Instead of taking stringent starting points like specific focal lengths, apertures, and required resolution, the designer took more leeway with the specifications, which resulted in odd focal lengths (77 mm instead of the more common 75 mm or 85 mm) and unusual maximum apertures (f/1,8 instead of f/1,4.)

The late Shoji Otake, a famous Japanese photographer, suggested eschewing the typical way to design lenses which "test well" by using computer-aided design and evaluate test charts. By his suggestion, the development team dismissed that methodology and instead used a meticulous process of evaluation of prints by men.

By accepting a certain degree of field curvature they were able to minimise astigmatism and chromatic aberration to a bare minimum and to finetune the out-of-focus boundaries (bokeh.) Thanks to this deliberate shift in paradigm, the gains, while hard to quantify in numbers, are tangible when looking at images and help explain the so-called 3D rendering of the Limited lenses. These design choices results in lenses that are well adapted to portraiture and subject isolation.

The lens features Pentax ghostless coating, first introduced with the FA 43mm Limited, to reduce flare to a bare minimum. The Ghostless SMC was developed at request of the Japanese traffic police force who was faced with the problem with severe glares on photos of car plates taken during the night, thus making them unreadable.
