= Pentax F 17-28mm lens =

Digital camera lens

smc PENTAX-F FISH-EYE ZOOM 17mm–28mm F3.5-4.5
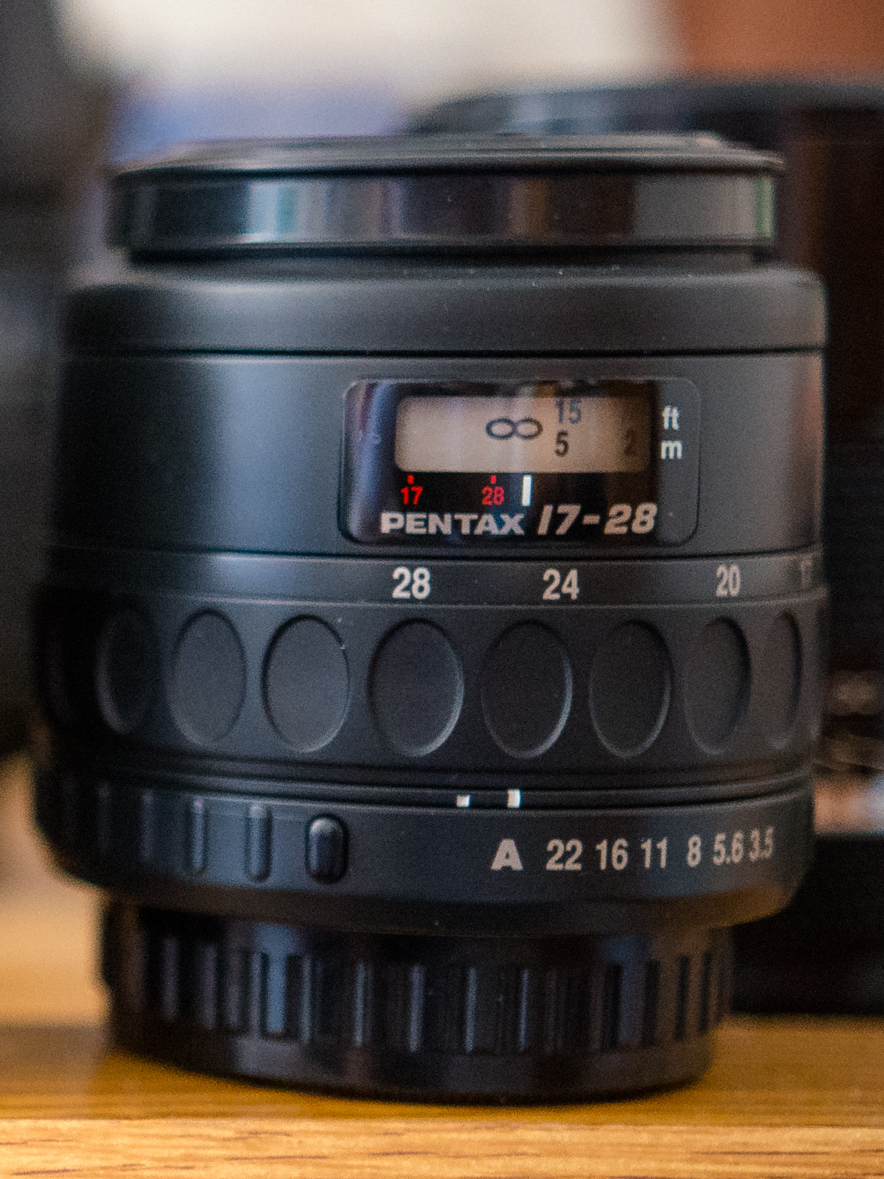
- Maker: Pentax

Technical data
- Type: Zoom
- Focus drive: screw
- Focal length: 17–28mm
- Crop factor: 1
- Aperture (max/min): f/3.5-4.5
- Close focus distance: 0.45 m (1 ft 6 in)
- Max. magnification: 0.07
- Construction: 9 elements in 7 groups

Features
- Lens-based stabilization: No No
- Macro capable: No No
- Unique features: Fisheye
- Application: Special Effect

Physical
- Max. length: 61 mm (2.4 in)
- Diameter: 65 mm (2.6 in)
- Weight: 255 g (9.0 oz)
- Filter diameter: N/A

Accessories
- Lens hood: built-in

Angle of view
- Diagonal: 180°–90°

The smc Pentax-F 17–28mm Fish-eye f/3.5–4.5 is the first fisheye zoom lens, manufactured by Pentax for single-lens reflex cameras (SLRs) with a K lens mount. At its widest setting of 17mm, it affords a 180° diagonal angle of view images for all K-mount full-frame SLR cameras; at 28mm, the diagonal angle of view is reduced to 90° on the diagonal. Typical fisheye barrel distortion is evident at all focal lengths. A successor model, the Pentax DA 10-17mm lens, was introduced with the same view angles and closer focusing capability for APS-C cameras in 2006.

== History and design ==
The lens was designed by Jun Hirakawa and a patent was applied for the design in 1994, granted in 1998.

Longtime photography writer Herbert Keppler was a noted fan of the lens, as its unique zoom capabilities allow the user to minimize the appearance of barrel distortion. Keppler wrote in an informal review "You don't use this lens to make your best girl- or boyfriend look pretty or handsome, but it does produce some fantastically fascinating effects. [...] there still are many moments when its coverage just fits the coverage of my mind."

== Gallery ==
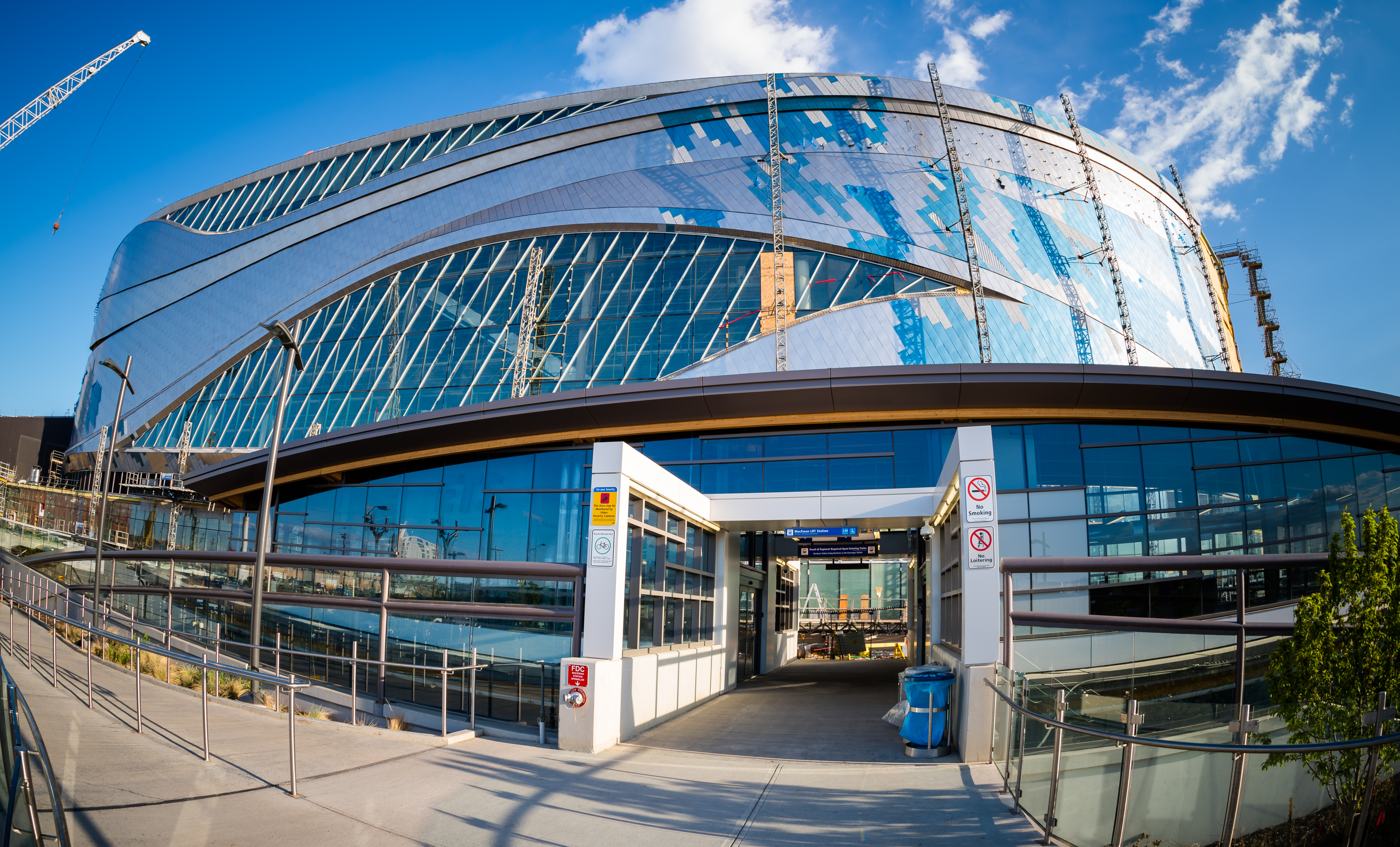
Rogers Centre, 17mm (2016).

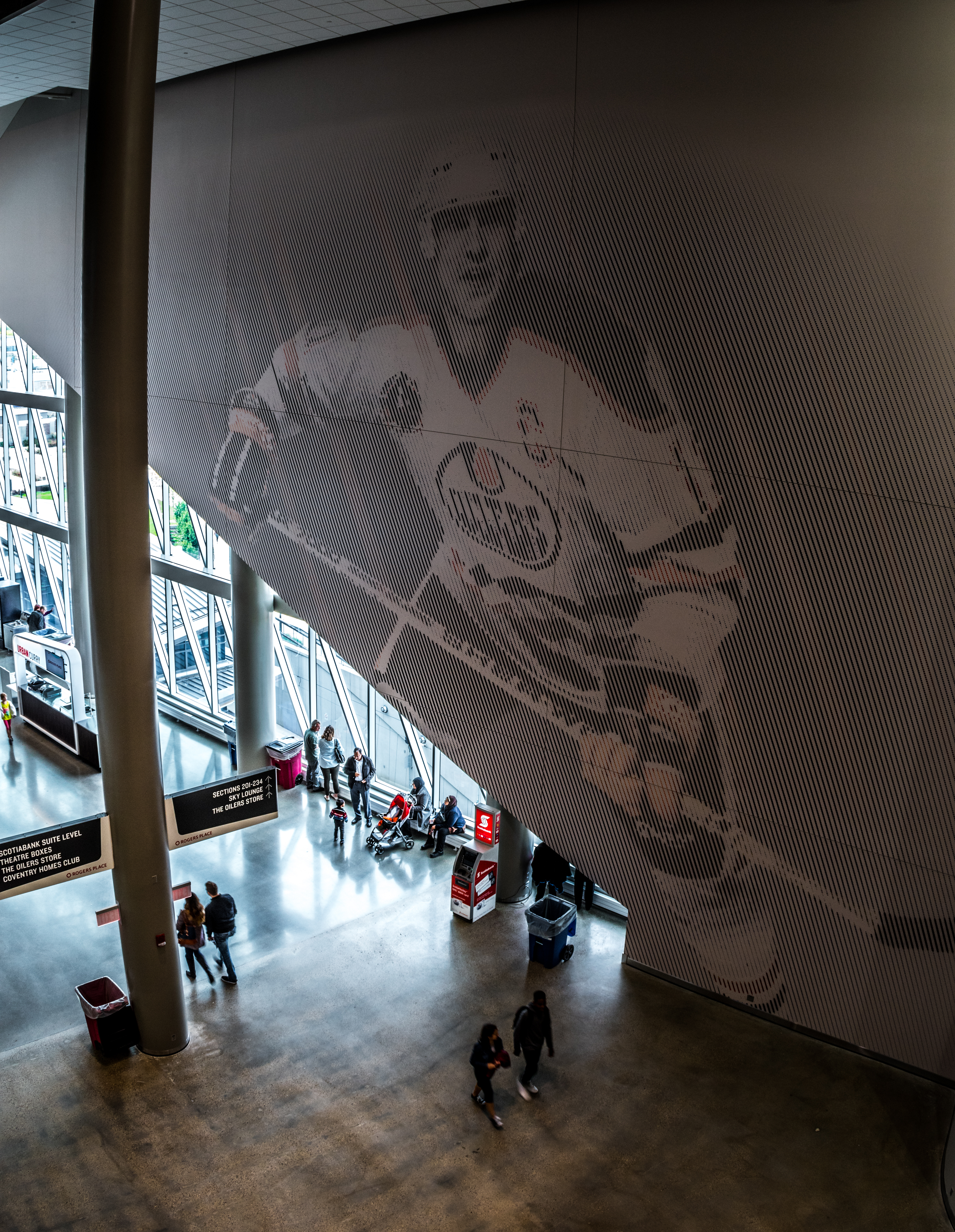
Inside Rogers Centre, 28mm (2016).

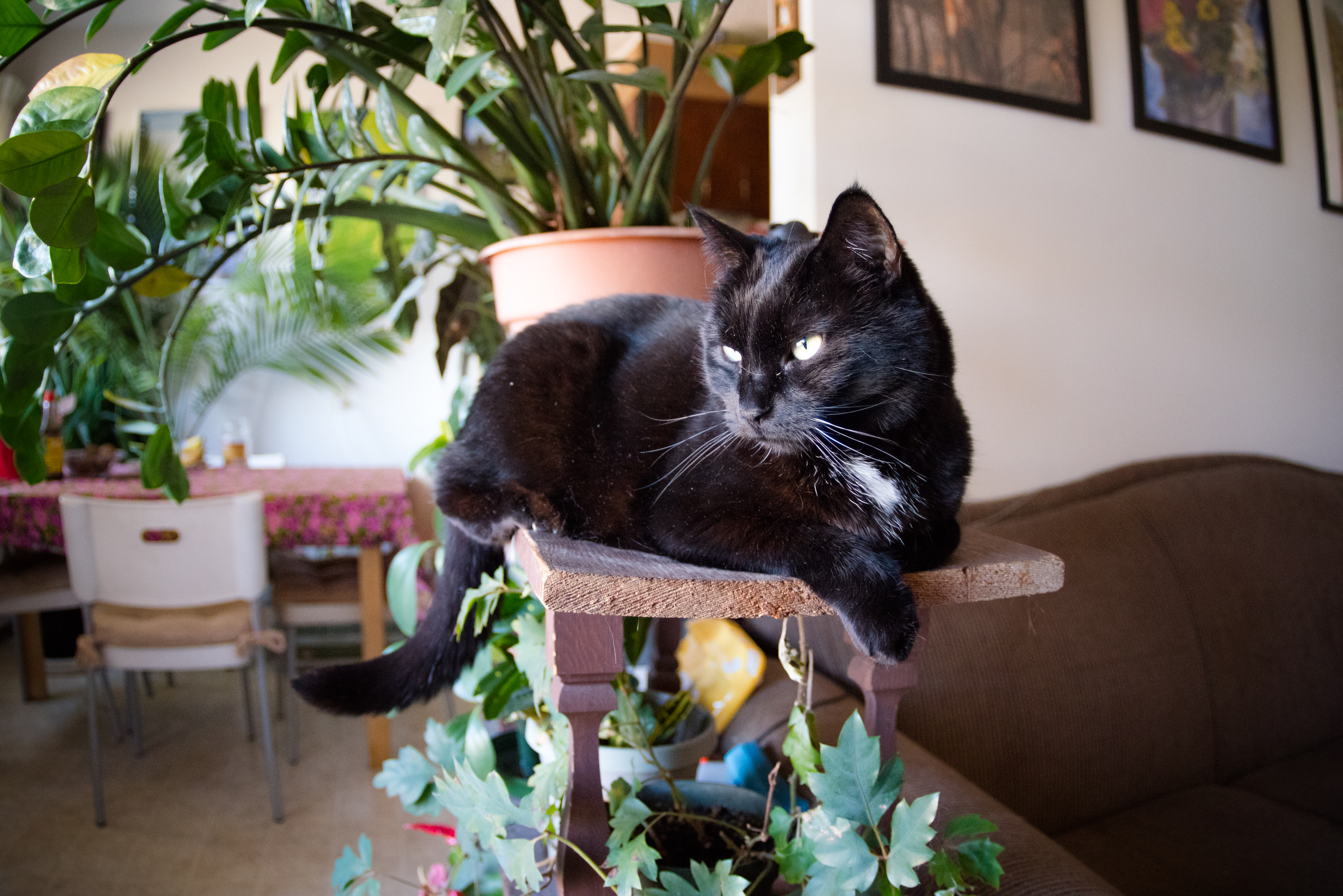
Distortion minimized by subject matter and placement, 28mm (2016).

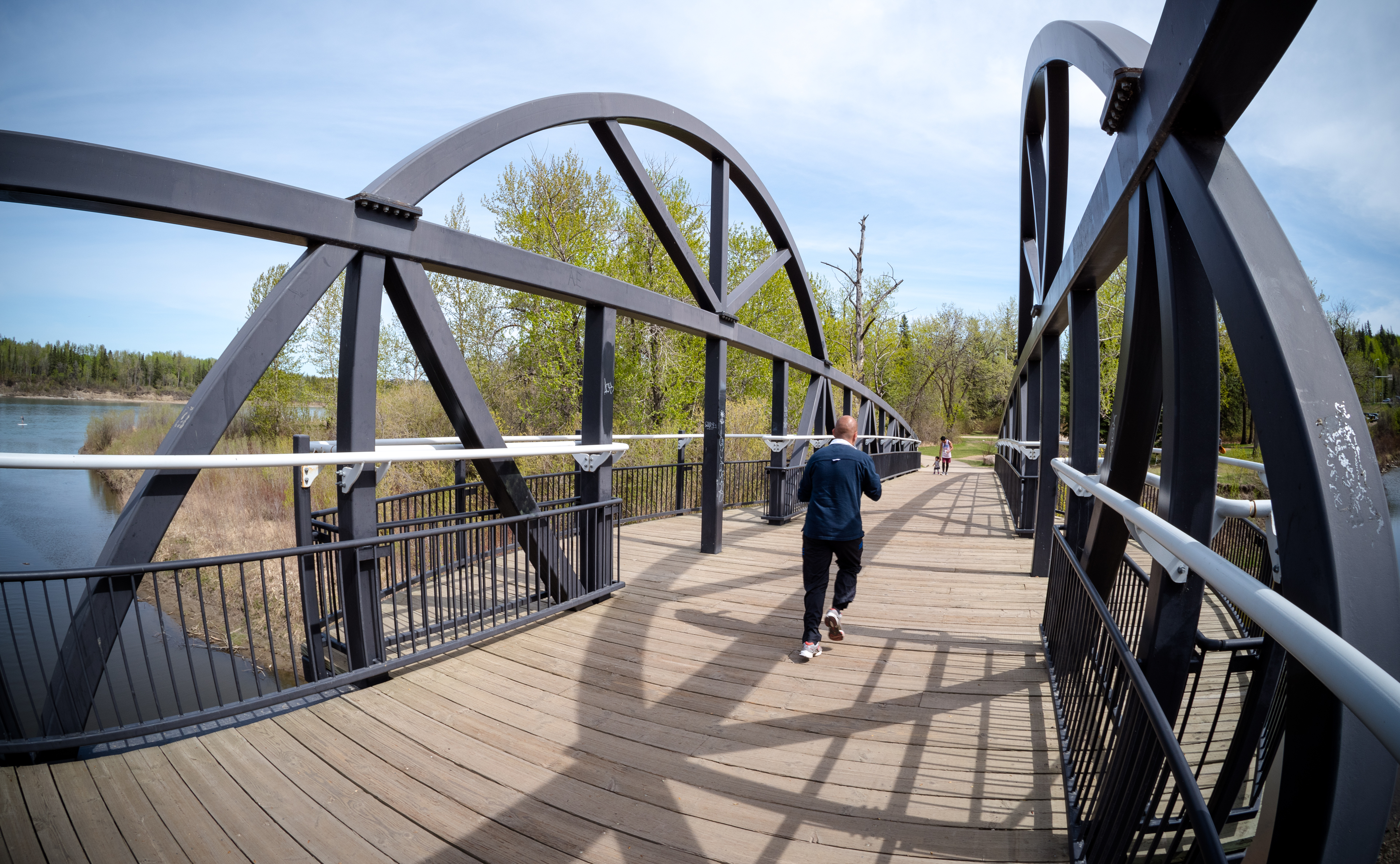
Lines not passing through center are distorted, 17mm (2016).

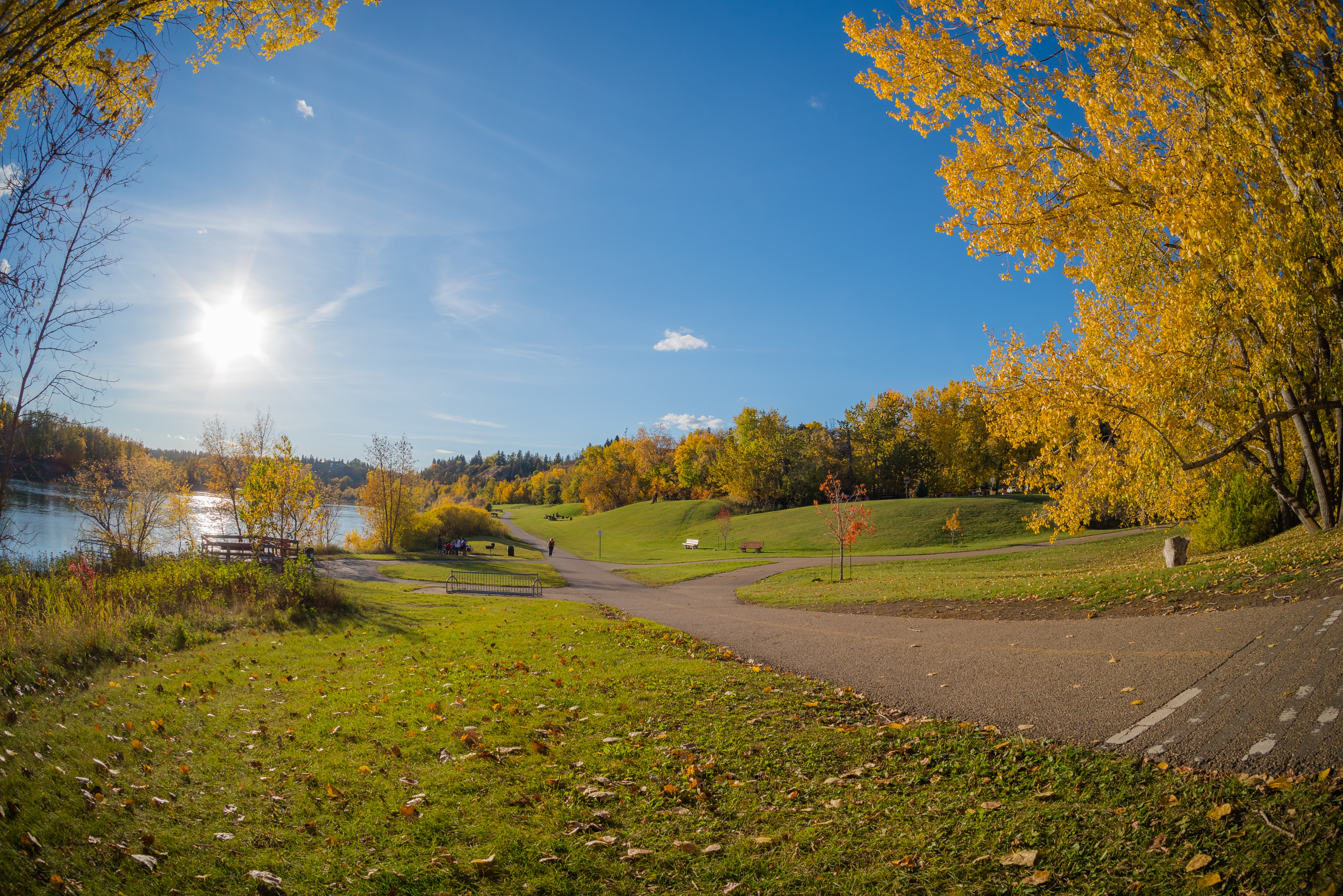
Distortion at full-frame view, 17mm (2016).
