= Pentax DA 10-17mm lens =

smc Pentax-DA 10-17mm f/3.5-4.5 ED (IF) Fish-Eye
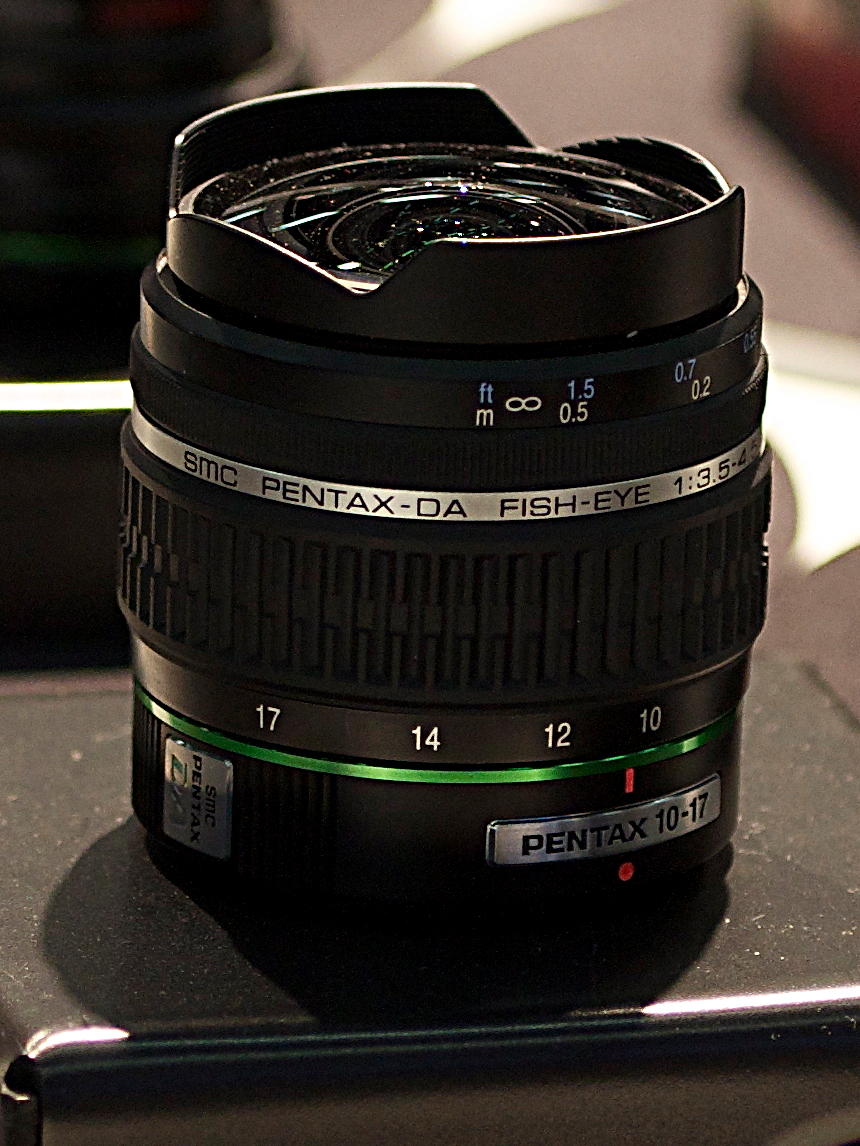
- Maker: Pentax

Technical data
- Type: Zoom
- Focus drive: Screwdrive
- Focal length: 10-17mm
- Focal length (35mm equiv.): 15-25.5mm
- Crop factor: 1.5
- Aperture (max/min): f/3.5-4.5 / f/22-32
- Close focus distance: 0.46 ft (0.14 m)
- Max. magnification: 0.39x
- Diaphragm blades: 6
- Construction: 10 elements in 8 groups

Features
- Manual focus override: Yes Yes
- Macro capable: No No
- Unique features: Fisheye zoom
- Application: Landscape, industrial, artistic

Physical
- Max. length: 2.8 in (71 mm)
- Diameter: 2.7 in (69 mm)
- Weight: 11.3 oz (320 g)
- Filter diameter: None

Accessories
- Lens hood: Integral
- Case: S80-80

Angle of view
- Diagonal: 180 to 100 degrees

History
- Introduction: January 2006

Retail info
- MSRP: 579.95 USD (as of 2006)

The smc Pentax-DA 10-17mm f/3.5-4.5 ED (IF) Fish-Eye lens is a fisheye zoom lens for the Pentax K-mount. It offers an up to 180 degree view, and allows quick shift focus (Pentax's term for giving the photographer the ability to manually focus the lens even when the camera is in autofocus mode without damaging the lens or camera).

== History and design ==
A patent for the lens design was filed on 30 August 2005, and granted in 2008. The design is credited to Takayuki Ito and Jun Hirakawa. Pentax announced the lens on November 30, 2005, with availability to commence in January 2006. It was designed in conjunction with Tokina, who would later market a self-branded version in Nikon AF-D and Canon EF mounts starting in October 2006. The 10–17mm lens was seen as a re-release of the earlier Pentax F 17–28mm lens introduced in the mid-1990s, providing similar functionality with the focal lengths and coverage updated for APS-C format digital SLRs. Compared to the earlier lens, the 10-17mm lens has improved close-focus capability.

Glass technologies used in this lens include ED glass for low dispersion and reducing chromatic aberration, as well as the SP super-protect coating for repelling dust, grease and water. It has a 35mm equivalent focal length of 15mm-26mm.

== Gallery ==
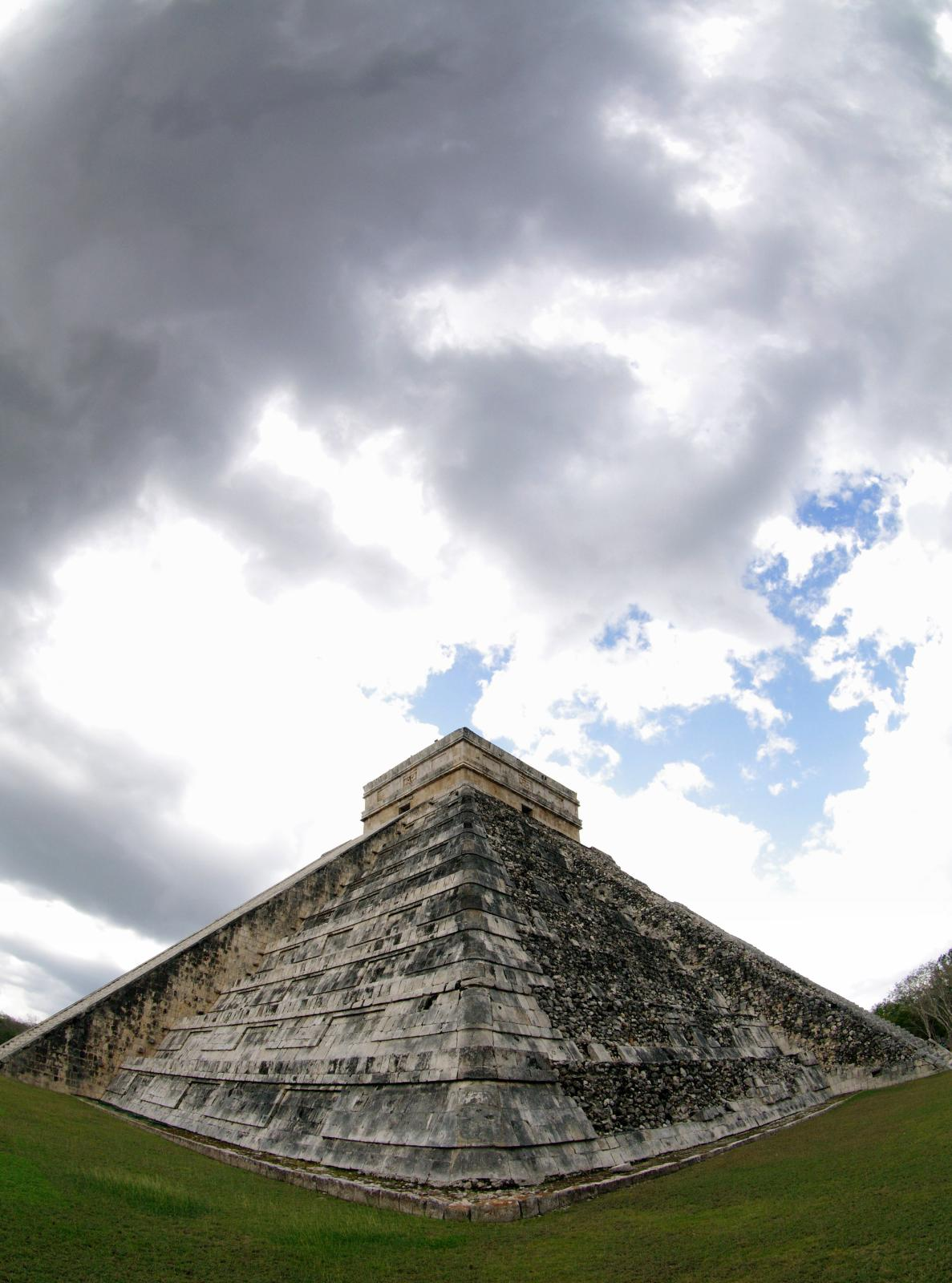
El Castillo at 10mm. Lines not running through the center are distorted.

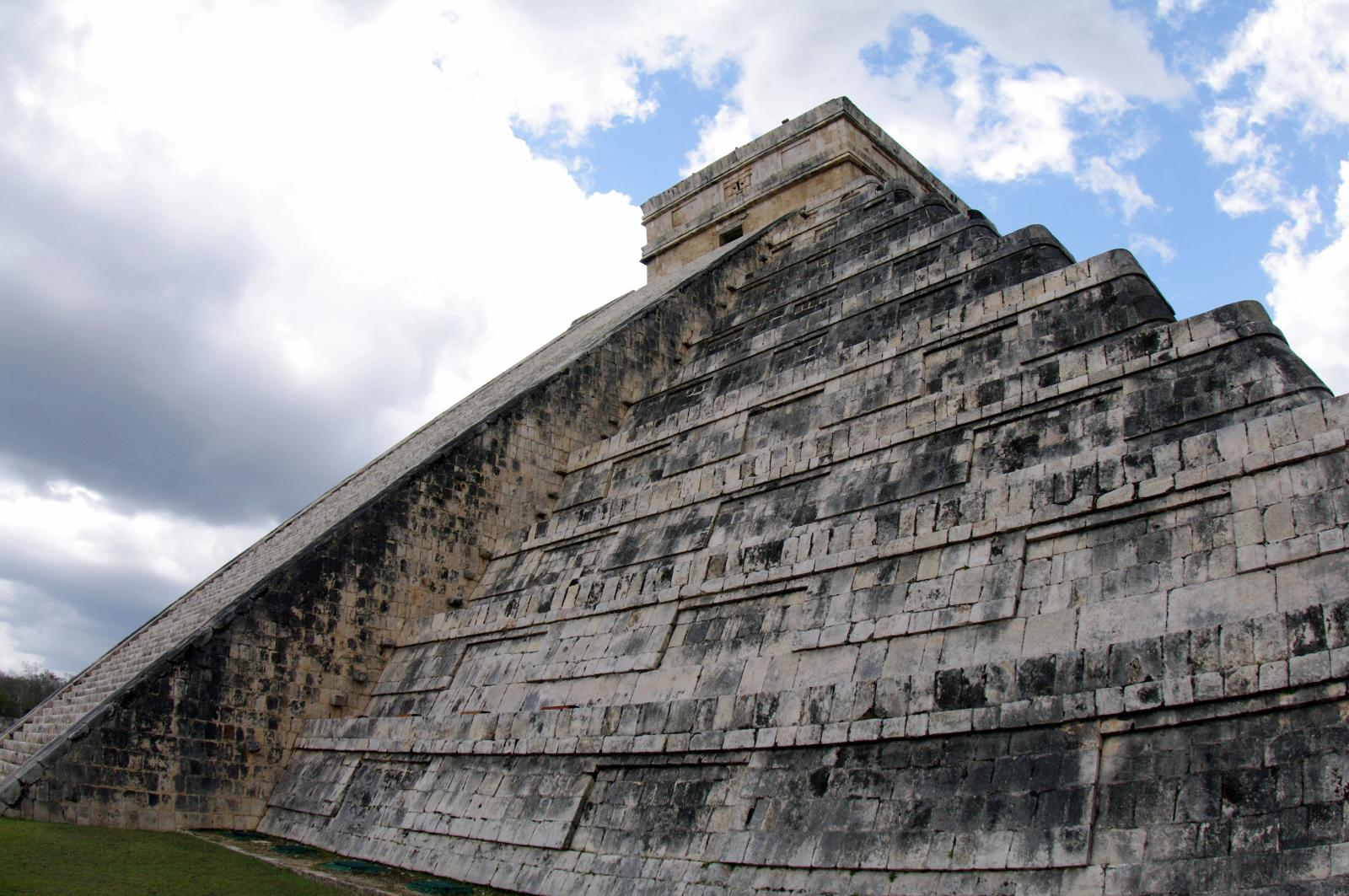
El Castillo photographed at 17mm. Distortion is still visible, but minimized.

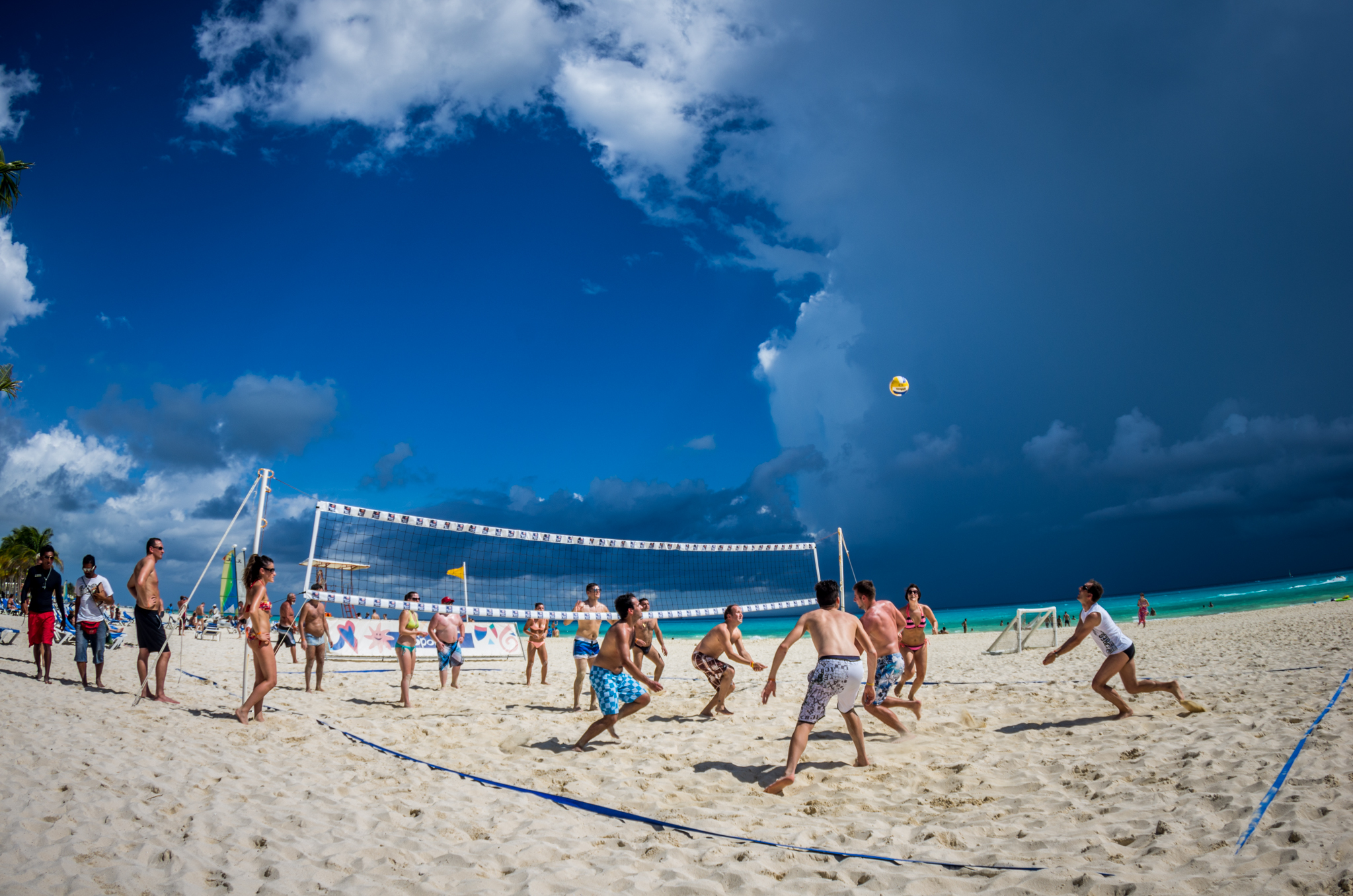
Distortion still evident in off-center horizon at 14mm.

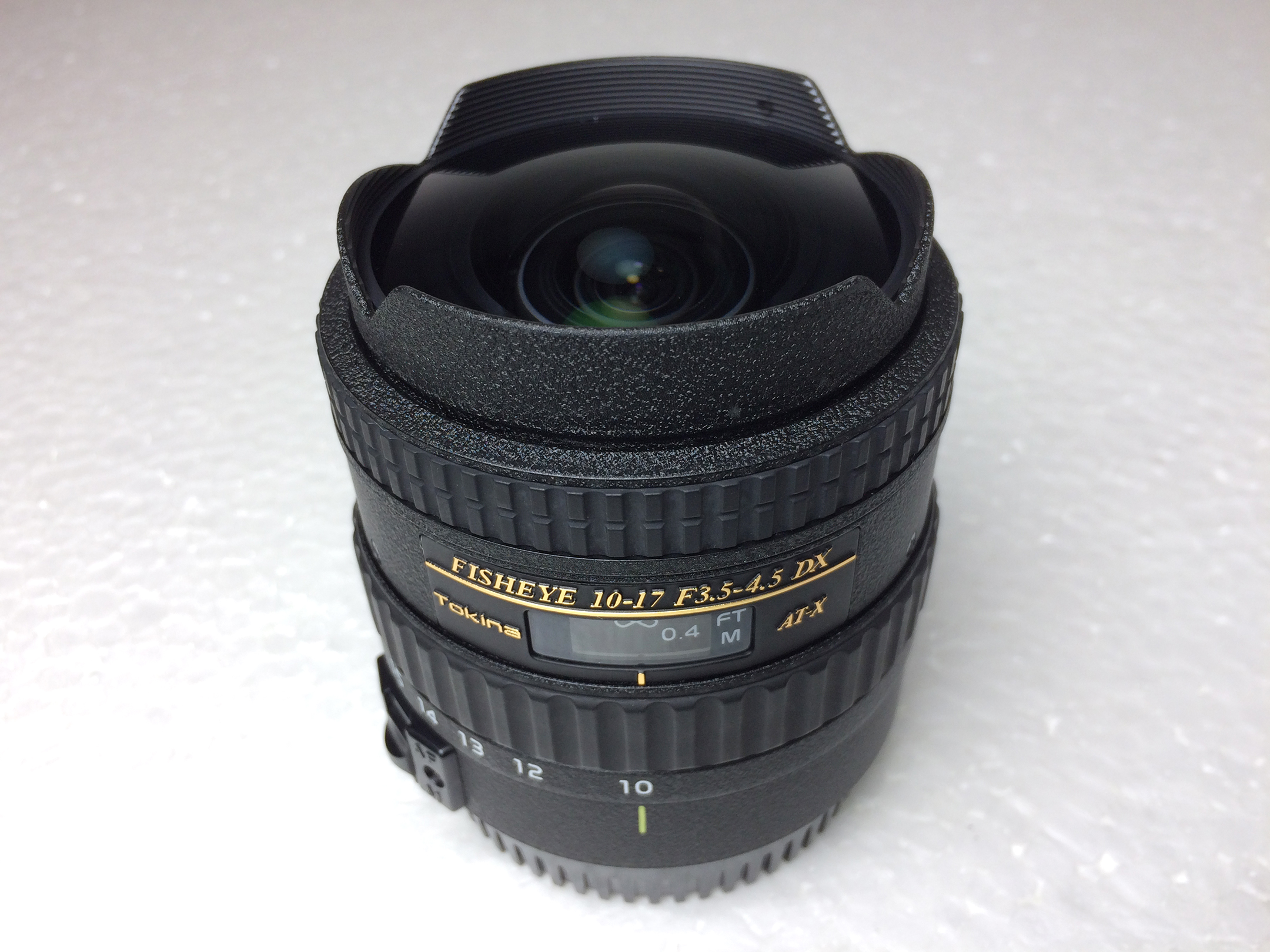
Tokina 10–17mm lens.

== See also ==
- Pentax F 17–28mm, the world's first fisheye zoom lens
