= Pentax DA* 50-135mm lens =

Pentax smc DA* 50-135mm F2.8 ED (IF) SDM
- Maker: Pentax
- Lens mount(s): Pentax K

Technical data
- Type: Zoom
- Focus drive: Ultrasonic
- Focal length: 50-135mm
- Aperture (max/min): f/2.8
- Close focus distance: 1.00 metre (3.28 ft)
- Max. magnification: 0.17
- Diaphragm blades: 9
- Construction: 18 elements in 14 groups

Features
- Manual focus override: Yes Yes
- Weather-sealing: Yes Yes
- Lens-based stabilization: No No
- Aperture ring: No No

Physical
- Diameter: 77 millimetres (3.0 in)
- Weight: 685 grams (1.510 lb)
- Filter diameter: 67mm

History
- Introduction: 2007

The Pentax smc DA* 50-135mm F2.8 ED (IF) SDM is an interchangeable camera lens announced by Pentax on February 21, 2007.
