= Pentax DA* 55mm lens =

smc Pentax-DA* 55mm f/1.4 SDM
- Maker: Pentax

Technical data
- Type: Prime
- Focal length: 55mm
- Focal length (35mm equiv.): 82.5mm
- Crop factor: 1.5
- Aperture (max/min): f/1.4 / f/22
- Close focus distance: 0.45 metres (18 in)
- Max. magnification: 0.173x
- Diaphragm blades: 9, rounded
- Construction: 9 elements in 8 groups

Features
- Manual focus override: Yes Yes
- Ultrasonic motor: Yes Yes
- Weather-sealing: Yes Yes
- Unique features: Weather-resistant
- Application: Portrait

Physical
- Max. length: 66.0 millimetres (2.60 in)
- Diameter: 70.5 millimetres (2.78 in)
- Weight: 375 grams (13.2 oz)
- Filter diameter: 58mm

Accessories
- Lens hood: PH-RBH 58mm
- Case: S90-100

Angle of view
- Diagonal: 28.6°

History
- Introduction: 2008

Retail info
- MSRP: 799.95 USD

The smc Pentax-DA* 55mm f/1.4 SDM lens is a professional prime lens for the Pentax K-mount. It is designed for portrait use with a 35mm equivalent focal length of 82.5mm. The lens features weather sealing, an SDM ultrasonic motor for quiet autofocus, and has 9 rounded diaphragm blades for smoother bokeh. Autofocus speed is similar to an equivalent screwdrive lens.
