= Pentax DA 14mm lens =

Pentax smc DA 14mm F2.8 ED (IF)
- Maker: Pentax
- Lens mount(s): Pentax K

Technical data
- Type: Prime
- Focus drive: Screwdrive
- Focal length: 14mm
- Aperture (max/min): f/2.8
- Close focus distance: 0.17 metres (0.56 ft)
- Max. magnification: 0.19
- Diaphragm blades: 6
- Construction: 12 elements in 11 groups

Features
- Manual focus override: Yes Yes
- Weather-sealing: No No
- Lens-based stabilization: No No
- Aperture ring: No No

Physical
- Max. length: 69 millimetres (2.7 in)
- Diameter: 84 millimetres (3.3 in)
- Weight: 420 grams (0.93 lb)
- Filter diameter: 77mm

History
- Introduction: 2004

The Pentax smc DA 14mm F2.8 ED (IF) is an interchangeable camera lens announced by Pentax on February 2, 2004.
