= Pentax DA* 16-50mm lens =

The DA* 16–50mm lens is a family of professional wide-angle lenses made by Ricoh Imaging. The current version, the HD DA* 16-50mm f/2.8L ED PLM AW, replaced the older smc DA* 16-50mm f/2.8 ED IF SDM lens in 2021.

== smc DA* 16-50mm F2.8 ED AL (IF) SDM ==
The Pentax smc DA* 16-50mm F2.8 ED AL (IF) SDM was an advanced standard zoom lens for Pentax K-mount APS-C DSLR bodies, announced by Pentax on February 21, 2007. The lens suffered from frequent failures of the SDM autofocus drive motor due to design flaws. It also received poor reviews due to sub-par optical performance for a lens with the professional star rating. The lens was discontinued in late 2023.

== HD DA* 16-50mm F2.8 ED PLM AW ==
The Pentax HD DA* 16-50mm F2.8 ED PLM AW is a professional standard zoom lens for Pentax K-mount APS-C DSLR bodies. Development was announced on 25th May 2020, officially product name announced on October 25, 2021, launched on July 15, 2021 and first shipped in August 2021. As a replacement for the poorly regarded earlier version, it featured a new pulse linear motor (PLM) focusing motor design and refined optical structure, largely alleviating issues with the prior version. As a result of these changes the lens gained 147 grams and 18.5mm in length over its predecessor.

== Specifications ==
Attribute	smc ED AL [IF] SDM	HD ED PLM AW
Image		
Key features
Full-frame compatible	Yes No	
★-series	Yes Yes	
Macro	No No	
Manual focus override	Yes Yes	
Weather-sealing	Yes Yes	
Lens-based stabilization	No No	
Aperture ring	No No	
Technical data
Aperture (max-min)	f/2.8–f/32	
Construction	15 groups / 12 elements	16 groups / 10 elements
# of diaphragm blades	9	9 (rounded)
Closest focusing distance	0.3 m (0.98 ft)	
Max. magnification	0.21× (1:4.8)	0.24× (1:4.2)
Horizontal viewing angle	74°-27°	
Diagonal viewing angle	83°-31.5°	
Vertical viewing angle	52°-18°	
Physical data
Weight	565 g (1.246 lb)	712 g (1.570 lb)
Maximum diameter	84 mm (3.3 in)	84 mm (3.3 in)
Length	98.5 mm (3.88 in)	117 mm (4.6 in)
Filter diameter	77 mm	77 mm
Accessories
Lens hood	PH-RBJ77	PH-RBM77
Retail information
Release date	March 2007	July 2021
MSRP $	$749	$1,399
Street price $	$749	$1,399

Kind	Type	Focal length	Aperture	87	88	89	1990	91	92	93	94	95	96	97	98	99	2000	01	02	03	04	05	06	07	08	09	2010	11	12	13	14	15	16	17	18	19	2020	21	22	23	24	25
Prime	UWA	14	2.8																		DA 14mm f/2.8 ED AL																					
Prime	UWA	15	4.0																							DA 15mm f/4 Limited				HD DA 15mm f/4 ED AL Limited												
Prime	UWA	20	2.8									FA 20mm f/2.8 AL																														
Prime	UWA	21	2.4																																			HD D FA 21mm Limited DC				
Prime	UWA	21	3.2																				DA 21mm f/3.2 AL Limited								HD DA 21mm f/3.2 AL Limited											
Prime	WA	24	2.0					FA* 24mm f/2 AL																																		
Prime	WA	31	1.8															FA 31mm f/1.8 Limited																				HD FA 31mm 1.8 Limited				
Prime	WA	35	2.0													FA 35mm f/2 AL																				HD FA 35mm f/2 WR						
Prime	WA	35	2.4																								DA 35mm f/2.4 AL															
Prime	WA	35	2.8																							DA 35mm f/2.8 Limited Macro					HD DA 35mm f/2.8 Limited Macro											
Prime	normal	40	2.8																		DA 40mm f/2.8 Limited									HD DA 40mm f/2.8 Limited												
Prime	normal	40	2.8																										DA 40mm f/2.8 XS													
Prime	normal	43	1.9											FA 43mm f/1.9 Limited																								HD FA 43mm 1.9 Limited				
Prime	normal	50	1.4	F 50mm f/1.4				FA 50mm f/1.4																																Classic		
Prime	normal	50	1.4																																					HD FA		
Prime	normal	50	1.4																																HD FA* 50 f/1.4 SDM AW							
Prime	normal	50	1.8																										DA 50mm f/1.8 AL													
Prime	normal	50	2.8		F 50 Macro		FA 50mm f/2.8 Macro															D FA 50mm f/2.8 Macro																				
Prime	normal	55	1.4																						DA* 55mm f/1.4 SDM																	
Prime	Short Tele	70	2.4																				DA 70mm f/2.4 Limited								HD DA 70mm f/2.4 Limited											
Prime	Short Tele	77	1.8													FA 77mm f/1.8 Limited																						HD FA 77mm 1.8 Limited				
Prime	Short Tele	85	1.4						FA* 85mm f/1.4																													HD D FA* 85mm 1.4 SDM AW				
Prime	Tele	100	2.8	F 100mm f/2.8 Macro				FA 100mm f/2.8 Macro													D FA 100mm f/2.8 Macro					D FA 2.8 Macro Macro WR														HD D FA AW		
Prime	Tele	135	2.8	F 135mm 2.8					FA 135mm 2.8																																	
Prime	Tele	200	2.8							FA* 200mm f/2.8 ED															DA* 200mm f/2.8 SDM																	
Prime	4.0	200														FA* 200mm f/4 Macro ED																										
Prime	Super tele	300	2.8								FA* 300mm f/2.8 ED																															
Prime	Super tele	300	4.x	F* 300mm f/4.5 ED				FA* 300mm f/4.5 ED																	DA* 300mm f/4 SDM																	
Prime	Super tele	400	5.6											FA* 400mm f/5.6 ED																												
Prime	Ultra tele	560	5.6																										HD DA 560mm f/5.6 ED AW													
Prime	Ultra tele	600	4.0		F* 600mm f/4 ED			FA* 600mm f/4 ED																																		
Zoom	Fisheye		3.5-4.5									F 17-28mm f/3.5-4.5 Fish-Eye														DA 10-17mm f/3.5-4.5 Fish-Eye											HD DA 10-17mm 3.5-4.5 Fish-Eye					
Zoom	UWA	11-18	2.8																																	HD DA* 11-18 f/2.8 ED DC AW						
Zoom	UWA	12-24	4.0																			DA 12-24mm f/4 ED AL																				
Zoom	UWA	15-30	2.8																														D FA 15-30mm f/2.8 ED SDM WR									
Zoom	UWA	20-35	4.0												FA 20-40mm f/4 AL																											
Zoom	WA	16-45	4.0																	DA 16-45mm 4 ED AL																						
Zoom	WA	16-50	2.8																					DA* 16-50mm f/2.8 ED AL SDM														HD DA* 2.8 ED PLM AW				
Zoom	WA	16-85	3.5-5.6																												HD DA 16-85mm f/3.5-5.6 ED DC WR											
Zoom	WA	18-50	4-5.6																													HD DA 18-50 f/4-5.6 DC WR RE										
Zoom	WA	18-135	3.5-5.6																								DA 18-135mm f/3.5-5.6 ED AL DC WR															
Zoom	WA	20-40	2.8-4																												HD DA 20-40mm f/2.8-4 Limited DC WR											
Zoom	WA	24-50	4.0	F 24-50mm f/4																																						
Zoom	WA	24/28-70	2.8								FA* 28-70mm f/2.8 AL																						D FA 24-70mm f/2.8									
Zoom	Univ.	28-80	3.5-4.7					FA 28-80 f/3.5-4.7																																		
Zoom	Univ.	28-105	3.5/4-5.6						FA 28-105 f/4-5.6																									D FA 28-105 f/3.5-5.6 ED DC WR								
Zoom	Tele	50-135	2.8																					DA* 50-135mm f/2.8 ED SDM																		
Zoom	Tele	50-200	4-5.6																			DA 50-200mm f/4-5.6 ED				DA 50-200mm f/4-5.8 ED WR																
Zoom	Tele	55-300	4-5.8																						DA 55-300mm f/4-5.8 ED					DA 55-300mm f/4-5.8 ED WR												
Zoom	Tele	55-300	4.5-6.3																														HD DA 55-300mm f/4.5-6.3 ED PLM WR RE									
Zoom	Tele	60-250	4.0																						DA* 60-250mm f/4 ED SDM																	
Zoom	Tele	70/80-2x0	2.8								FA* 80-200mm f/2.8 ED																						HD D FA* 70-200mm f/2.8 ED DC AW									
Zoom	Tele	70/80-2x0	4.0																																		HD D FA 70-210 4 ED SDM WR					
Zoom	Tele	70/80-2x0	4-5.6	F 70-210mm f/4-5.6							FA 70-200mm f/4-5.6 ED																															
Zoom	Tele	100-300	4.5-5.6						FA 100-300mm f/4.5-5.6																																	
Zoom	Tele	150-450	4.5-5.6																														D FA 150-450mm f/4.5-5.6 ED DC AW									
Zoom	Tele	250-600	5.6		F* 250-600 ED			FA* 250-600 f/5.6 ED																																		
Teleconverter				F 1.7X AF																											HD DA 1.4X AW											
Kind	Type	Focal length	Aperture	87	88	89	1990	91	92	93	94	95	96	97	98	99	2000	01	02	03	04	05	06	07	08	09	2010	11	12	13	14	15	16	17	18	19	2020	21	22	23	24	25
