= Nagoya Institute of Technology =

Public university in Japan

Coordinates: 35°09′23.15″N 136°55′29.21″E

- 名古屋工業大学
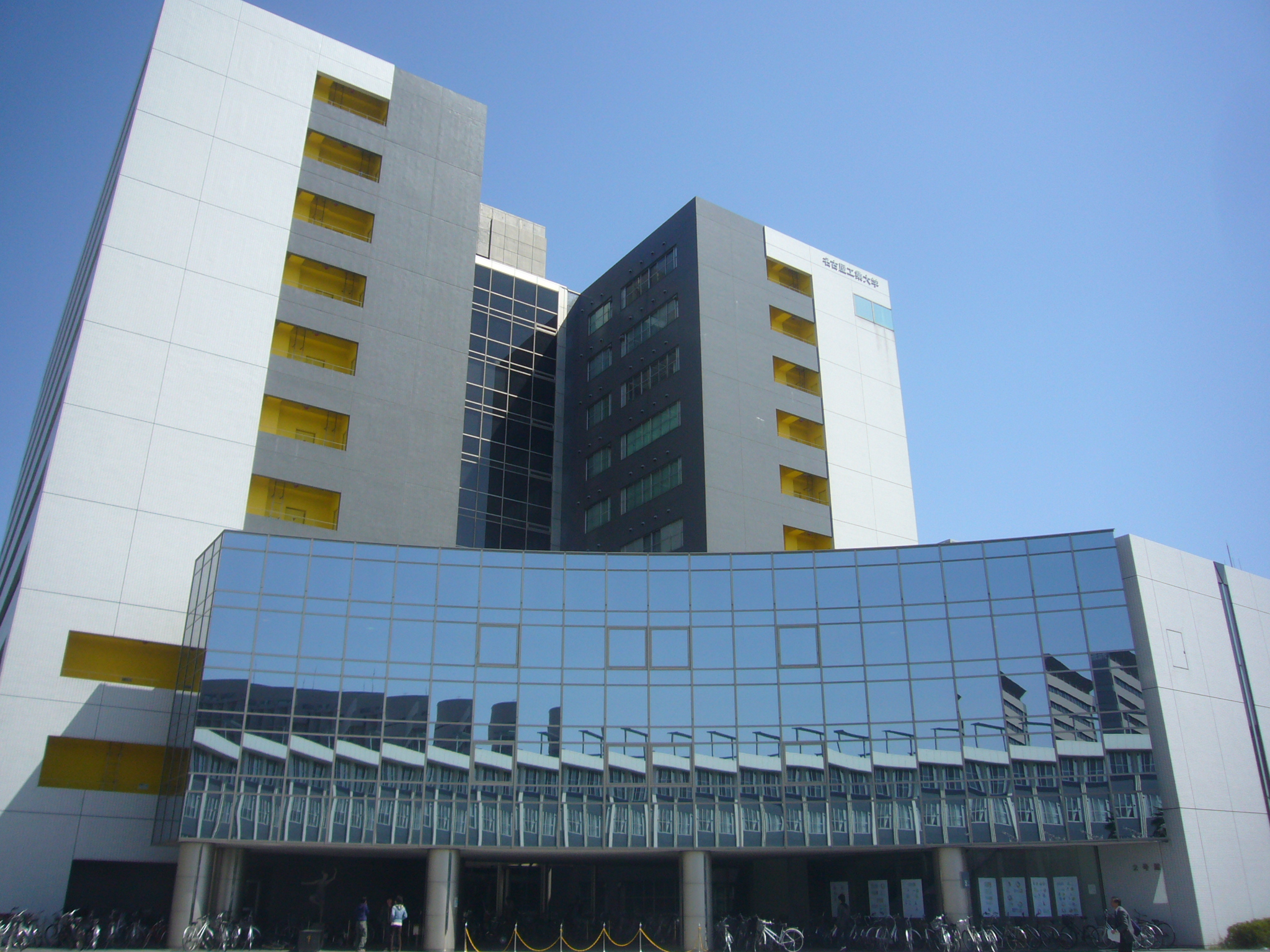
- Type: Public (national)
- Established: 1949
- President: Takatoshi Kinoshita
- Faculty: 556 (with staff)
- Undergraduates: 4,004 (full time only)
- Postgraduates: 1,672
- Location: Nagoya, Aichi prefecture, Japan
- Nicknames: 名工大 (Meikōdai), NITech
- Mascot: None
- Website: English website

The Nagoya Institute of Technology (名古屋工業大学, Nagoya Kōgyō Daigaku), abbreviated to Nitech (or in Japanese to 名工大, Meikōdai), is a public educational institution of science and technology located in Nagoya, Japan. Nitech was founded in 1905 as Nagoya Higher Technical School, then renamed Nagoya College of Technology in 1944, and then merged under the new educational system with the Aichi Prefectural College of Technology to be refounded as Nagoya Institute of Technology in 1949. In 2004 it was refounded as National University Corporation Nagoya Institute of Technology.

== Schools, Departments and Laboratories ==
=== Faculty of Engineering ===
- Life Science and Applied Chemistry
- Physical Science and Engineering
- Electrical and Mechanical Engineering
- Computer Science
- Architecture, Civil Engineering and Industrial Management Engineering
- Creative Engineering Program

=== Graduate School of Engineering ===
- Life Science and Applied Chemistry
- Physical Science and Engineering
- Electrical and Mechanical Engineering
- Computer Science
- Architecture, Civil Engineering and Industrial Management Engineering
- Nanopharmaceutical Sciences
- Nagoya Institute of Technology and University of Wollongong Joint Degree Doctoral Program in Informatics

=== Educational Research Centers ===
- Center for Research on Assistive Technology for Building New Communities
- OptoBioTechnology Research Center
- Advanced Ceramics Research Center
- Innovation Center for Multi-Business of Nitride Semiconductors
- Research Center for Nano Devices and Advanced Materials
- Advanced Manufacturing Research Center
- Center of Biomedical Physics and Information Technology
- NITech Artificial Intelligence Research Center
- Advanced Disaster Prevention Engineering Center

== Notable alumni ==
- Takayuki Ito
- Ken
- Taiichi Ohno
