= Pentax DA 55-300mm lens =

HD Pentax DA 55-300mm F4.0-5.8 ED WR
- Maker: Pentax
- Lens mount(s): Pentax K mount

Technical data
- Type: Zoom
- Focus drive: Screwdrive
- Focal length: 55-300mm
- Focal length (35mm equiv.): 82.5-450mm
- Crop factor: 1.5
- Aperture (max/min): f/4-5.8 / f/22-32
- Close focus distance: 55.2 in (1.4 m)
- Max. magnification: 0.28x
- Diaphragm blades: 6
- Construction: 12 elements in 8 groups

Features
- Manual focus override: Yes Yes
- Weather-sealing: Yes Yes
- Unique features: Quick-shift focus, filter window, ED glass element, SP (Super Protect) coating, HD coating

Physical
- Weight: 15.5 oz (440g)
- Filter diameter: 58mm

Accessories
- Lens hood: PH-RBG 58mm
- Case: S80-160

Angle of view
- Diagonal: 29.0-5.4 degrees

The HD Pentax DA 55-300mm lens, is a telezoom lens line for the Pentax K-mount. There are 4 generations so far.

The first generation was the SMC Pentax-DA 55-300mm F4-5.8 ED, green side band. It was produced from 2008 to 2013.

That lens design was additionally released with a plastic mount plate as the SMC Pentax-DA L 55-300mm F4-5.8 ED with a silver side band. This began in 2010 and is still in production.

The next release of this lens is the HD Pentax DA 55-300mm F4.0-5.8 ED WR, red side band, released in 2013. This upgraded the lens to HD coating, offering improved transmittance and reduced aberrations. It was also the first generation to have weather sealing. The optical formula was unchanged.

The 55-300mm lens was finally completely overhauled in 2016 and made about a third of a stop slower throughout the zoom range, and even more so at the long end. This version has a built-in Pulse Motor (PLM) for quieter, faster and more accurate autofocus, and a retractable design for easier transport. It is named the HD Pentax-DA 55-300mm f/4.5-6.3 ED PLM WR RE, has no side band and a green front band. It requires the KAF4 lens mount, so Pentax DSLRs before 2013 are not able to use this lens. Other compatible models still need a firmware update before they can use this lens. Some models, such as the Pentax K-30, can potentially bypass this limitation by running a "hacked" Pentax K-50 firmware.
