= Minolta RF Rokkor =

RF Rokkor
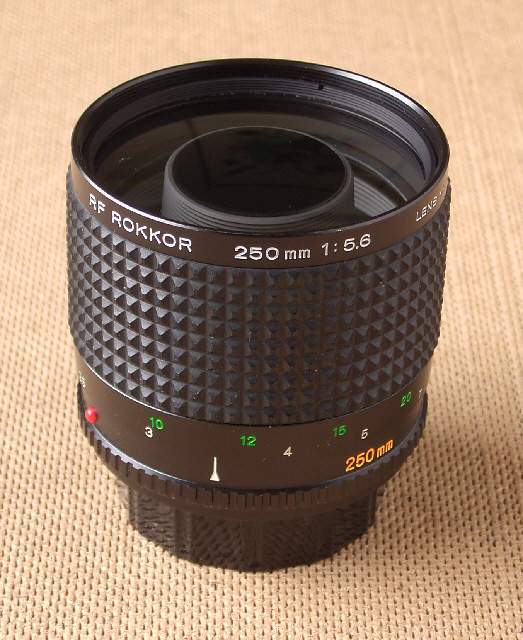
- RF Rokkor 250 mm 1:5.6
- Maker: Minolta

Technical data
- Type: Special Prime
- Focal length: 250, 500, 800, 1000, 1600 mm
- Aperture (max/min): varies
- Close focus distance: varies
- Max. magnification: varies
- Construction: varies elements in varies groups

Features
- Ultrasonic motor: No No
- Macro capable: No No
- Unique features: Catadioptric system
- Application: Telephoto

History
- Discontinuation: 1989
- Successor: Minolta AF Reflex 500mm f/8 for A-mount

Minolta manufactured and sold a series of RF Rokkor prime catadioptric lenses for its SR-mount single-lens reflex cameras starting in 1965 with the introduction of the 1000 mm f/6.3 RF Rokkor. This series of mirror lenses included focal lengths ranging from 250 mm to 1600 mm by the time the Rokkor lens brand was retired in the 1980s following the introduction of the autofocus Minolta A-mount system.

Exposure control was provided through neutral-density filters.

== History ==
Minolta RF Rokkor catadioptric telephoto lenses
FL	Ap.	Years	Constr.	Angle	Min. focus	Φ×L	Wgt.	Filt.	Notes
250	f/5.6	1979–1983?	6e/5g	10°	2.5 m (8.2 ft)	66.5×58 mm (2.6×2.3 in)	250 g (8.8 oz)	62F/39R	
500	f/8	1978–1983?	6e/5g	5°	4 m (13.1 ft)	83×98.5 mm (3.3×3.9 in)	600 g (21.2 oz)	77F/39R	
800	f/8	1972–1973	8e/7g	3°10'	8 m (26 ft)	125×166.5 mm (4.9×6.6 in)	1,900 g (4.2 lb)	slide/39R	UV and ND4× slide-in filters (one must be used) with additional 39mm rear-mounted filters
800	f/8	1973–1983?	8e/7g	3°10'	8 m (26 ft)	125×166.5 mm (4.9×6.6 in)	1,900 g (4.2 lb)	built-in / 39R	UV and ND4× built-in filters (switchable) with additional 39mm rear-mounted filters; lens colored white after 1981
1000	f/6.3	1965–1973	7e/6g	2°30'	30 m (98 ft)	217×594.5 mm (8.5×23.4 in)	10,600 g (23.4 lb)	200F/49R (turret)	Dual filter turrets
1600	f/11	1974–1977	7e/6g	1°30'	21 m (69 ft)	178×320 mm (7.0×12.6 in)	6,700 g (14.8 lb)	slide/39R	UV and ND4× slide-in filters (one must be used) with additional 39mm rear-mounted filters
1600	f/11	1977–1983?	6e/5g	1°30'	20 m (66 ft)	178×322.5 mm (7.0×12.7 in)	6,850 g (15.1 lb)	built-in / 39R	UV and ND4× built-in filters (switchable) with additional 39mm rear-mounted filters; lens colored white after 1981
