= Minolta AF Reflex 500mm f/8 =

Minolta Reflex 500mm f/8
- Maker: Minolta, Sony

Technical data
- Type: Special Prime
- Focal length: 500 mm
- Aperture (max/min): f/8 fixed
- Close focus distance: 4 m
- Max. magnification: 1/7.7
- Diaphragm blades: No blades, circular
- Construction: 7 elements in 5 groups

Features
- Ultrasonic motor: No No
- Macro capable: No No
- Unique features: AF capable Mirror Lens
- Application: Telephoto

Physical
- Max. length: 118 mm
- Weight: 665 g
- Filter diameter: Front 82mm & Rear drop-in (Clear and NDx4)

Accessories
- Lens hood: Front threaded

Angle of view
- Horizontal: 4.9°

History
- Introduction: 1989
- Discontinuation: 2010
- Successor: Minolta version succeeded by Sony version in 2006

Retail info
- MSRP: 699 USD (as of 2006)

Originally produced by Minolta, then by Sony, the AF Reflex 500mm f/8 was a catadioptric photographic lens compatible with cameras using the Minolta A-mount and Sony A-mount lens mounts.

The Minolta/Sony Reflex 500mm lens still (2024) is the only mirror lens designed and produced to auto focus with a 35mm film SLR camera. There are other mirror lenses that can mount onto current mounts such as Canon EF or RF and Nikon F or Z, but all other mirror lenses are manual focus only. Only the Minolta/Sony Reflex 500mm lens can have its focus controlled by the camera's autofocus motor in conjunction with TTL autofocus sensing. In terms of the Minolta AF and subsequent Konica Minolta and Sony α DSLR systems, this lens is an exception, being the only lens guaranteed to autofocus at f/8 on SLRs and DSLRs relying on dedicated PDAF sensors. Current mirrorless interchangeable lens cameras with PDAF and CDAF sensors integrated in their imaging sensor can provide AF with even lower aperture values. None of the current camera and lens manufacturers offer an AF Mirror lens, though.

Minolta also produced a V-mount 400 mm f/8 Reflex lens that can autofocus at f/8, which only fits the dedicated Vectis APS Minolta Vectis S-1, Minolta Vectis S-100 and Minolta Dimâge RD 3000 cameras.

The mirror design does not utilize aperture blades, and thus the aperture of the lens is fixed at f/8. Exposure may only be controlled by shutter speed, film or sensor sensitivity, or a slot-in neutral density filter. The lens possesses a filter holder to that avail.

By using a mirror design similar to that of a telescope, this lens uses very little glass compared to traditional telephoto lenses and is thus much smaller, lighter, and far less expensive than traditional lenses in the same focal length. However, like all mirror lenses, it can produce donut-shaped bokeh in images, due to the secondary mirror partially obstructing the front element.

== Limitations and use cases ==
The lens is quite sharp corner to corner. Like other lenses of catadioptic design it has no color fringing, but lacks some contrast (contrast can be enhanced in image post processing). It does not work well at close focus (closer than 6 m) and the fixed slow aperture f/8 means it can be used handheld mostly on sunny days. The small size (14cm long) and low weight (700g) makes it a 500mm lens that can easily be carried around.

The rendering of out of focus details can result in a busy background, but this is generally not a problem with smooth backgrounds. The lens can be good for photographing waterbirds, aircraft and landscape details. A teleconverter can be added for images of the moon.

== Adapters for Sony E-Mount ==
Using this lens on a Sony E-mount camera requires an adapter such as one of the Sony LA-EA series, not all of which are compatible with all E-mount cameras or A-mount lenses. The LA-EA2, LA-EA4 and LA-EA5 adapters have the screw drive required to enable autofocus, which is however limited to select cameras for each adapter. Otherwise, the lens will be manual focus only. The latter proves a very viable solution, even despite the shallow depth of field of the long focal length.

== RF ROKKOR-X manual focus version ==
Since 1977, i.e. before the introduction of its autofocus system, Minolta also made manual focus, SR-mount 500mm f/8 catadioptric lenses, designated RF, RF ROKKOR, and RF ROKKOR-X successively. Their optical schemes of 6 lens elements in 5 groups differ slightly between each other, and are not the same as this autofocus lens, using 7 elements. Still, it can of course be used (fully manually) on modern cameras such as Sony E-mount, but requires a different adapter type.

Minolta 500mm f/8 AF Reflex Lens

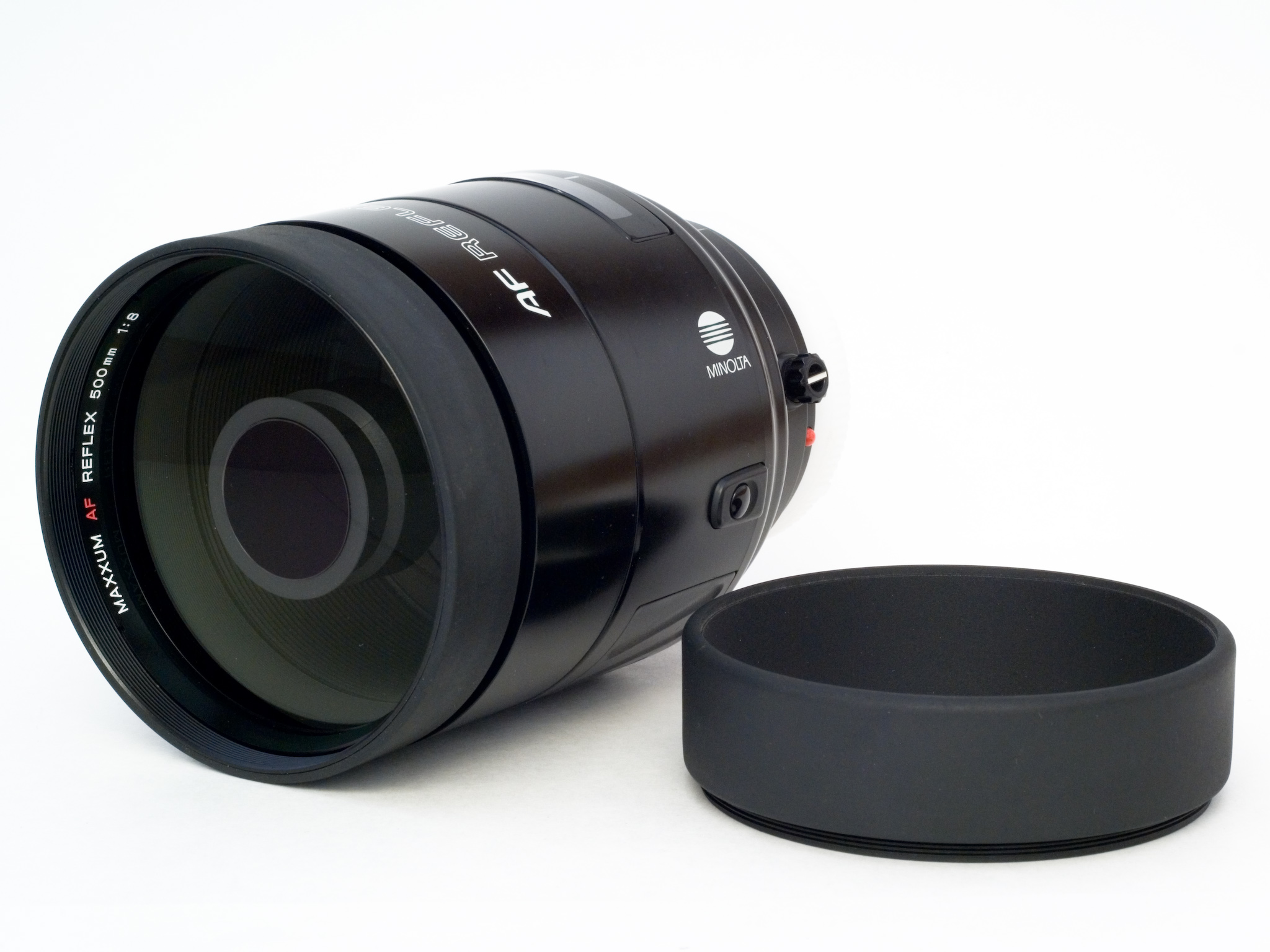
Minolta Reflex 500mm Hood off

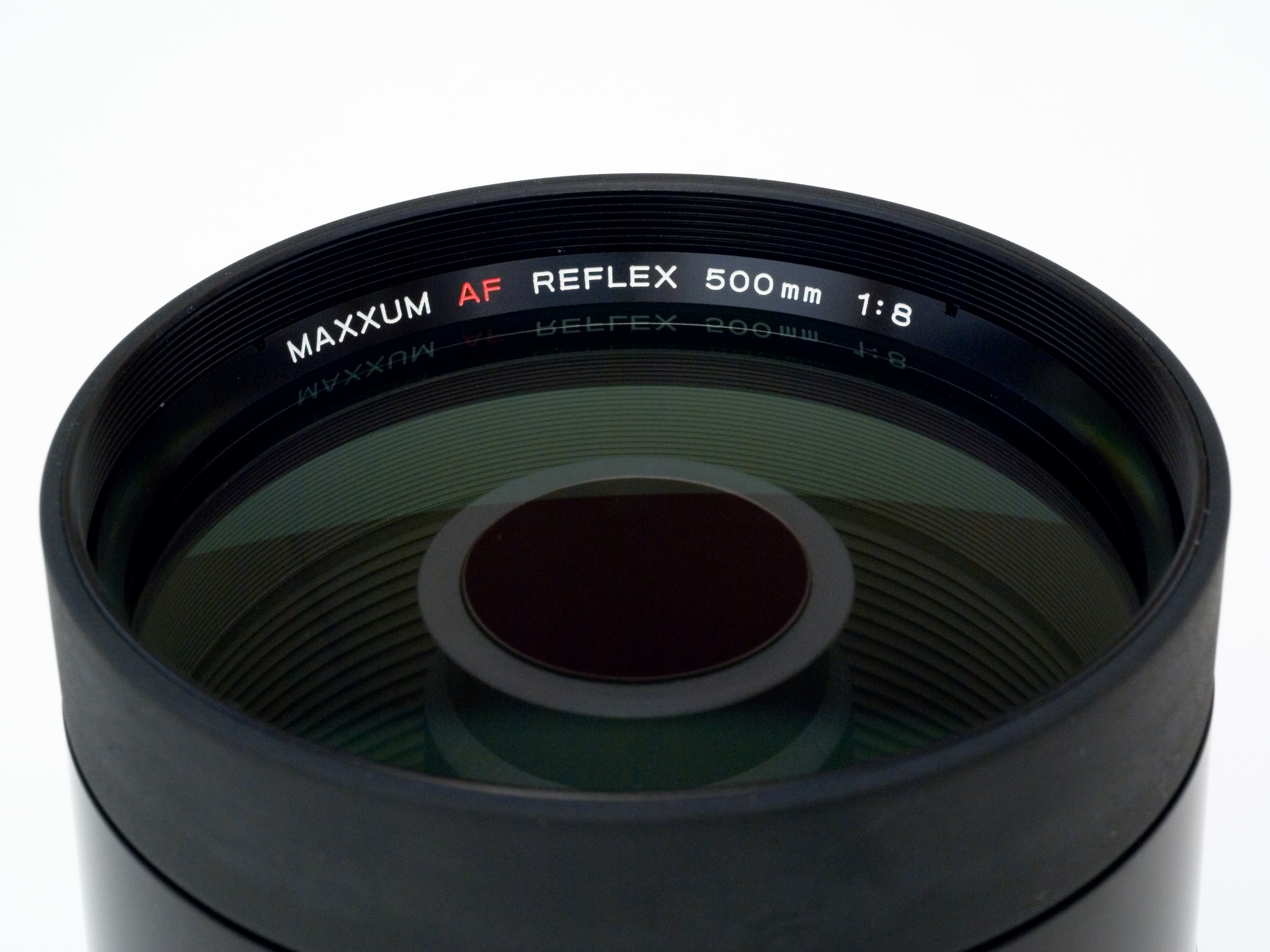
Minolta Reflex 500mm Front design

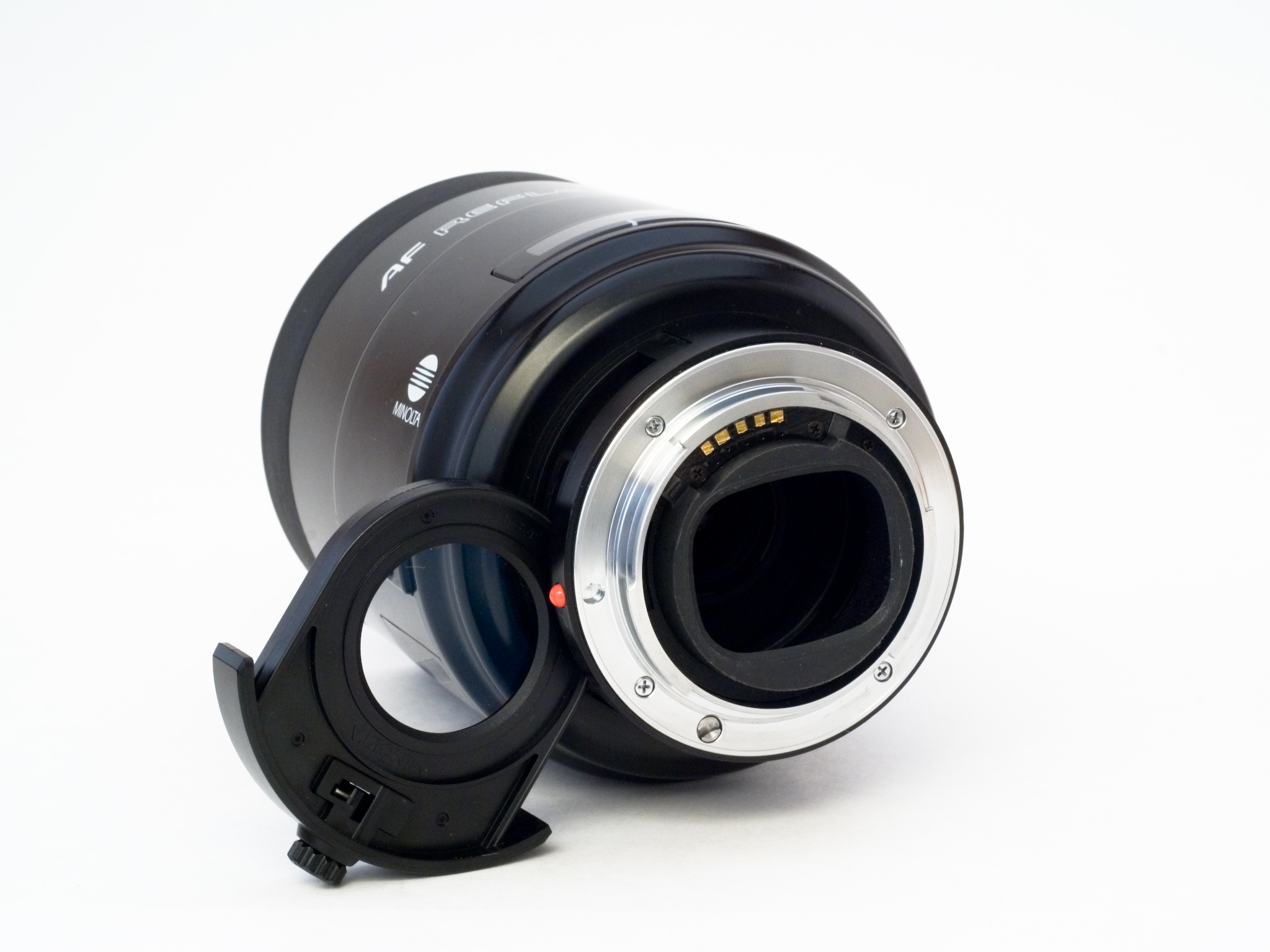
Minolta Reflex 500mm Rear filter out
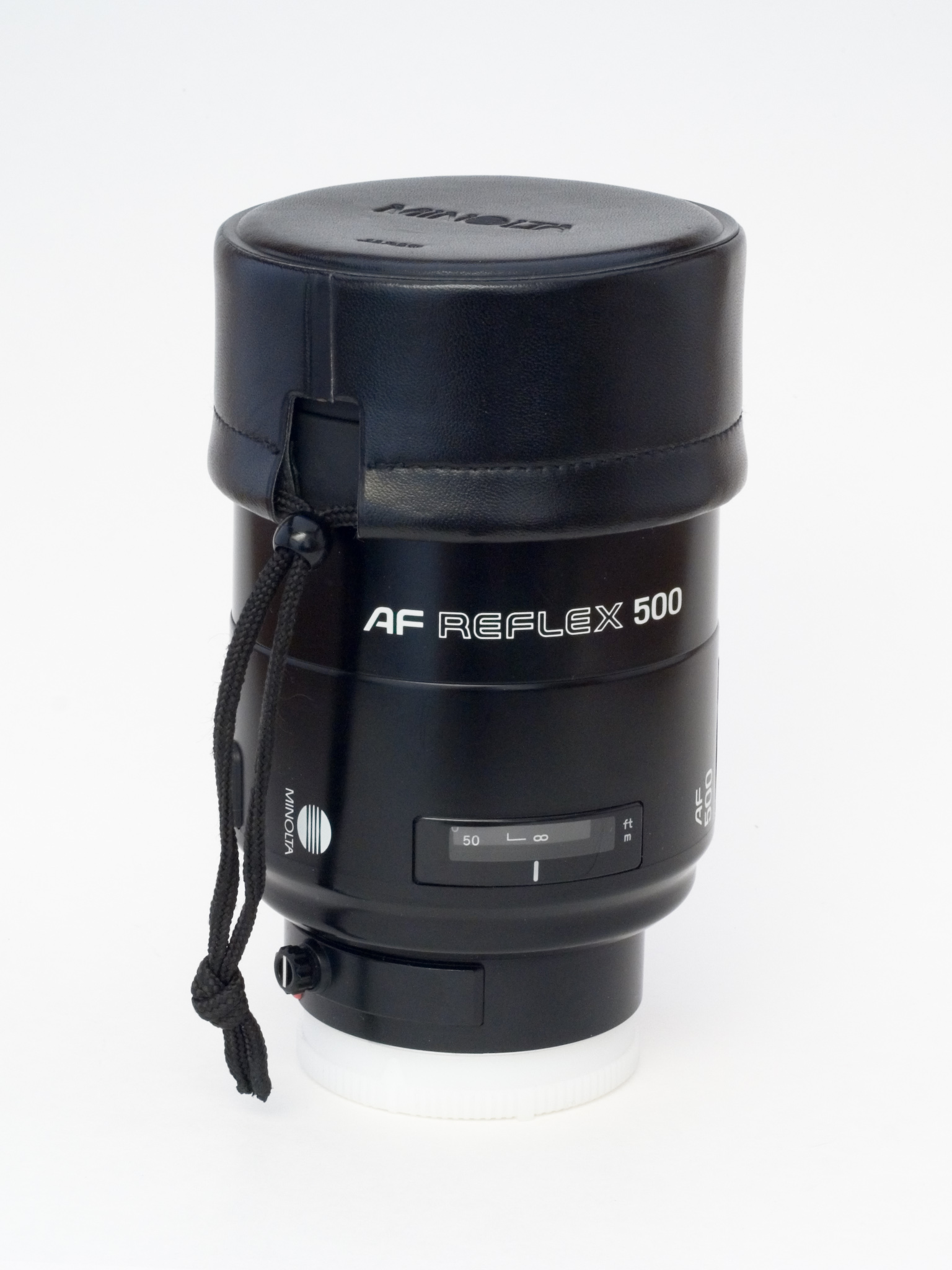
Minolta Reflex 500mm Hood on, cap on

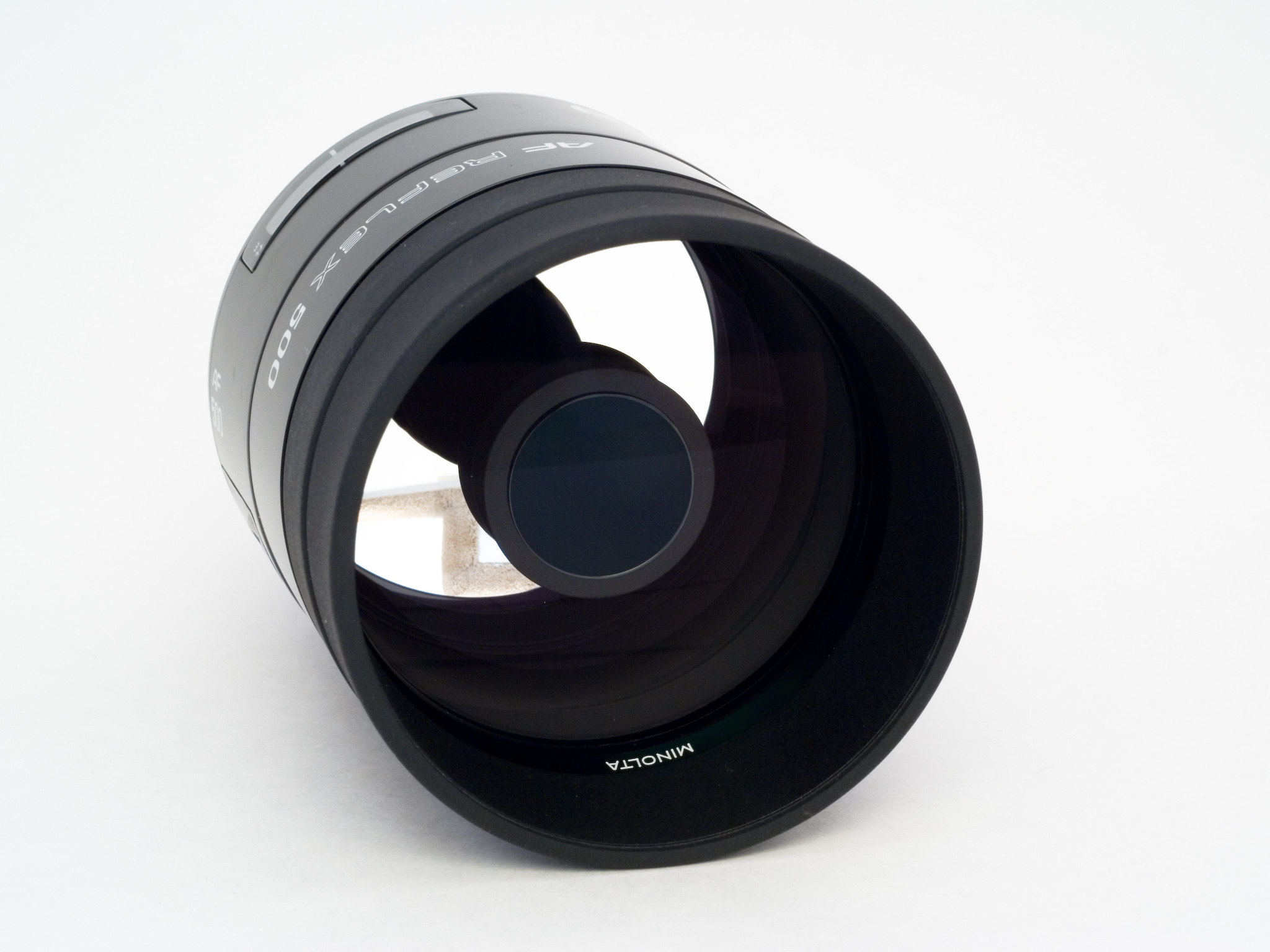
Minolta Reflex 500mm Mirror assembly

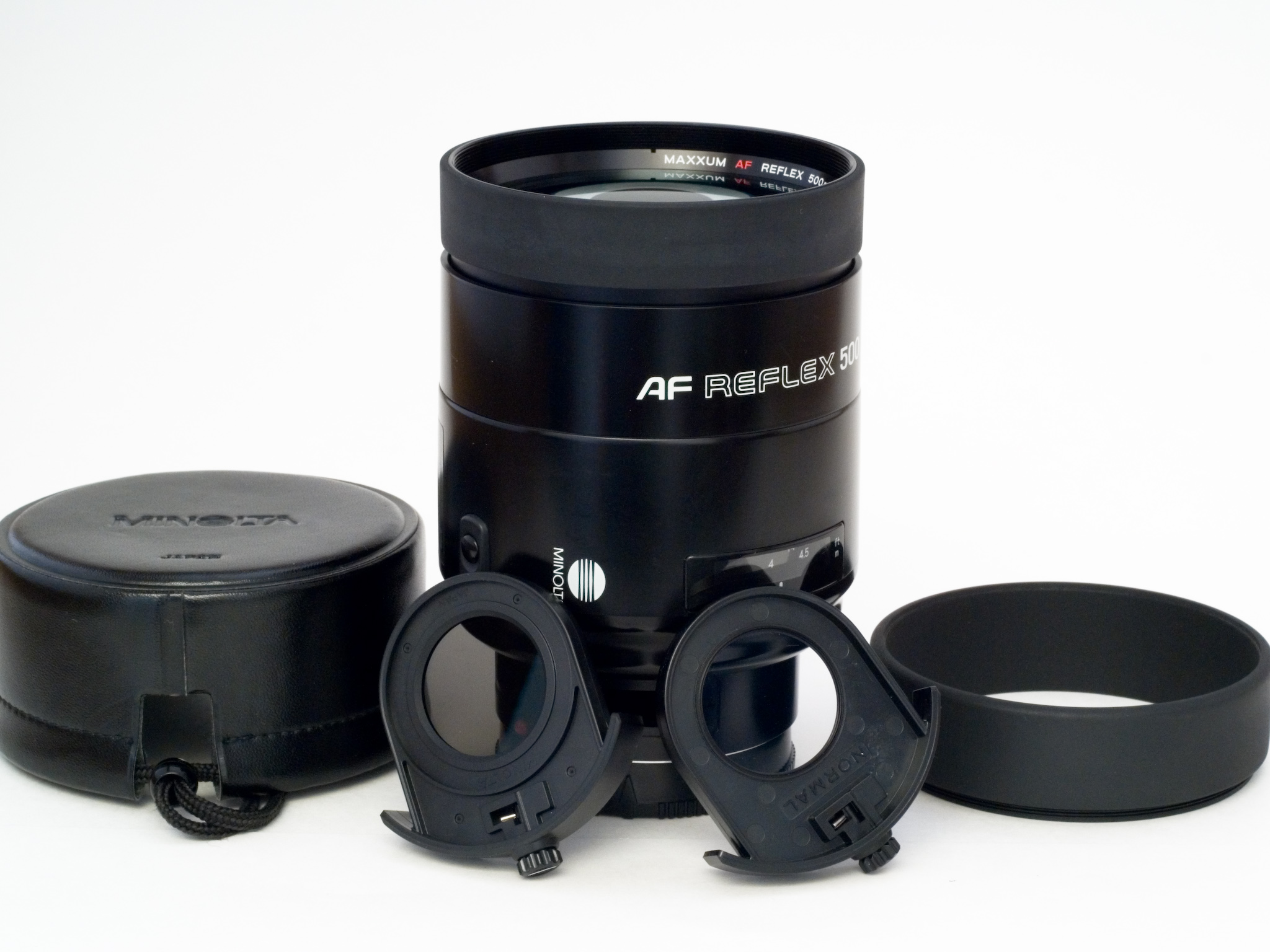
Minolta Reflex 500mm Kit

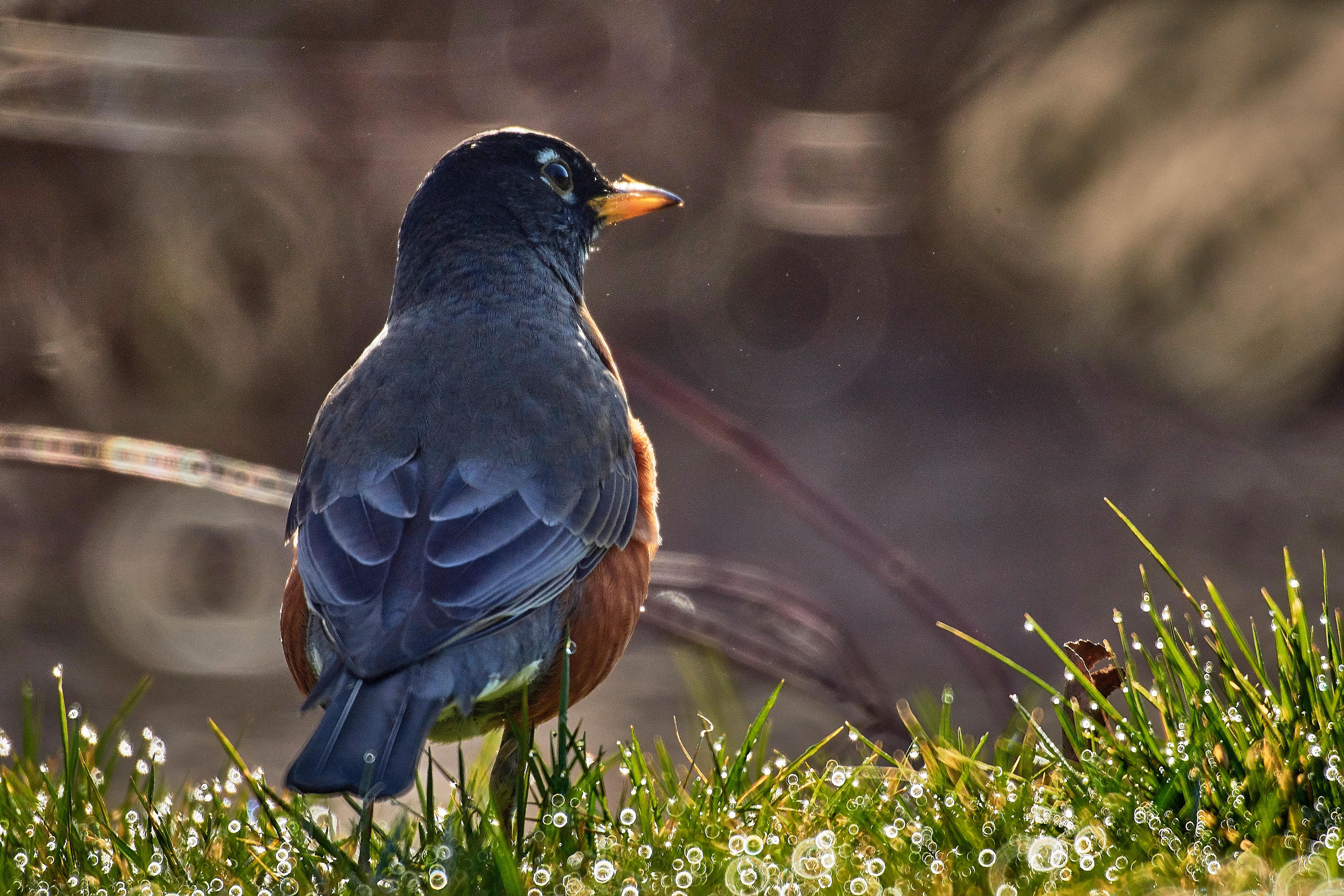
American Robin taken with the Minolta AF Reflex 500mm F8 showing the 'donut bokeh' characteristic of mirror lenses

== See also ==
- List of Minolta A-mount lenses

== Sources ==
- Dyxum lens data
