= CxProcess =

Proprietary image processing technology

CxProcess is the trademark of an image processing technology used in Minolta and Konica Minolta digital cameras.

Image processing in a camera converts the raw image data from a CCD image sensor into the format that is stored on the memory card. This processing is one of the bottlenecks in the speed of digital cameras.

Between 2001 and 2006, CxProcess was used in various Minolta and Konica Minolta digital compact cameras, bridge cameras, and DSLRs. In order to distinguish the image processing algorithms from the image processor, the image processor was named SUPHEED (for superior image and speed) since 2003. It can be seen as the predecessor of Sony's Bionz image processor since their taking-over of Konica Minolta's camera business in 2006.

CxProcess was originally introduced with the Minolta DiMAGE 5 in 2001. SUPHEED was introduced with the DiMAGE A1 in 2003, which was also the first to implement CxProcess II.

Cameras such as the DiMAGE 7 series (DiMAGE 7, 7i, 7Hi), A1, and A2 used a MegaChips (MCL) DSC-2 MA07163 series of 32-bit RISC processors with MIPS R3000 core. The cameras ran under Integrated Systems' (ISI) operating system pSOSystem/MIPS (pSOS+/MIPS V2.5.4, pREPC+/MIPS V2.5.2, pHILE+/MIPS FA V4.0.2, pNA+/MIPS V4.0.5).

The CxProcess III was implemented in the Konica Minolta Maxxum 7D (2004) and 5D (2005) utilizing SUPHEED II, a MegaChips DSC-3H MA07168 running under MiSPO's NORTi/MIPS, an RTOS following the μITRON standard.

While no longer named CxProcess III on SUPHEED II, this was also implemented in the Sony Alpha 100 (2006), utilizing a MegaChips MA07169.

Sony introduced their Bionz image processor in 2007 that was originally based on this same technology.

== See also ==
- Expeed – Nikon
- DIGIC – Canon
