= Janet Hatta =

Japanese actress

- Born: 21 July 1953 (age 73)
- Other names: Yuka Hatta (八田 有加, Hatta Yuka)
- Occupation: Actress
- Spouse: Kōichi Tabuchi
- Children: Yūshō Tabuchi

Janet Hatta (ジャネット八田; born July 21, 1953) is an actress.

== Biography ==
Her mother is Japanese and her father is an American. After working as a stewardess for Japan Airlines, she entered acting. She briefly used the name Yuka Hatta (八田 有加, Hatta Yuka). In 1981, she married Kōichi Tabuchi, who at that time played baseball for the Seibu Lions and retired from acting. The couple later appeared in commercials for Sakuracolor (a predecessor of Konica Minolta). They have a son, Yūshō Tabuchi, who is an announcer for Fuji Television.

== Appearances ==
On television, Hatta was a regular character in various jidaigeki. In Yaburegasa Tōshū Akuningari, starring Kinnosuke Yorozuya, she appeared in episodes 1–83 as the character Muttsuri Oryū. In Edo o Kiru (Part III) with Teruhiko Saigō she portrayed Okyō. With Masakazu Tamura, she appeared in Wakasamazamurai Torimonochō, as Okon. She made guest appearances in Kozure Ōkami, Abarenbo Shogun and numerous other series.

She also appeared in contemporary dramas. Among them was Supergirl, with Yōko Nogiwa, in which her character was in episodes 1–25. She was a regular in the NHK "Ginga Terebi Shōsetsu" Katei Sensō (1975) and Seishun Gigashū (1981, with Takeshi Kaga). She had guest roles in G-Men '75 with Tetsurō Tamba and Tokusō Saizensen, among others.

Highlights of Hatta's film career include the Kinji Fukasaku film Doberman Detective with Sonny Chiba and Ningen no shōmei with Yūsaku Matsuda (directed by Junya Sato).
