= Konica Minolta =

Japanese technology company

Konica Minolta, Inc.
- The Konica Minolta logo, which incorporates a slight modification of the final Minolta logo originally designed by Saul Bass in 1981

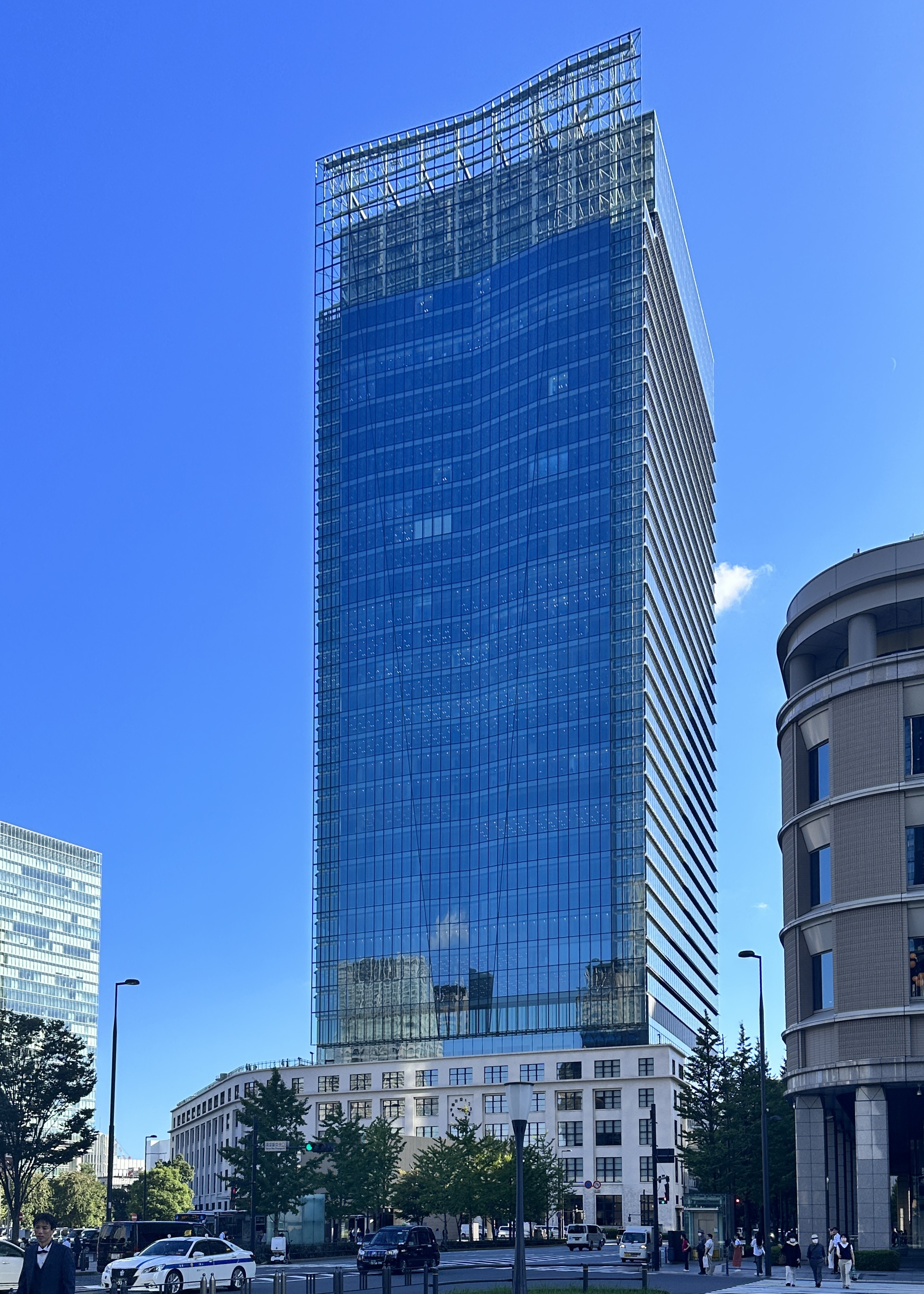
- Headquarters at JP Tower in Marunouchi, Chiyoda, Tokyo
- Native name: コニカミノルタ株式会社
- Romanized name: Konika Minoruta kabushiki gaisha
- Formerly: Konica Minolta Holdings, Inc. (2003–2013)
- Type: Public KK
- Traded as: TYO: 4902
- Industry: Electronics
- Predecessors: Konica; Minolta
- Founded: 5 August 2003; 23 years ago
- Headquarters: Marunouchi, Chiyoda, Tokyo, Japan
- Area served: Worldwide
- Key people: Toshimitsu Taiko (President and CEO)
- Products: Office equipment; Medical imaging; Graphic imaging; Optical devices; Measuring instruments
- Revenue: ¥1,088 trillion (March 2026)
- Net income: ¥31,836 billion (March 2026)
- Number of employees: 34,363 (March 2026)
- Website: www.konicaminolta.com

Konica Minolta, Inc. (Japanese: コニカミノルタ, Hepburn: Konika Minoruta) is a Japanese multinational technology company headquartered in Marunouchi, Chiyoda, Tokyo, with offices in 45 countries worldwide. The company manufactures business and industrial imaging products, including printers, multi-function printers (MFPs) and digital print systems for the production printing market. Konica Minolta's Managed Print Service (MPS) is called Optimised Print Services. The company also makes optical devices, including lenses and LCD film; medical and graphic imaging products, such as X-ray image processing systems, colour proofing systems, and X-ray film; photometers, 3-D digitizers, and other sensing products; and textile printers. It once had camera and photo operations inherited from Konica and Minolta but they were sold in 2006 to Sony, with Sony's Alpha series being the successor SLR division brand.

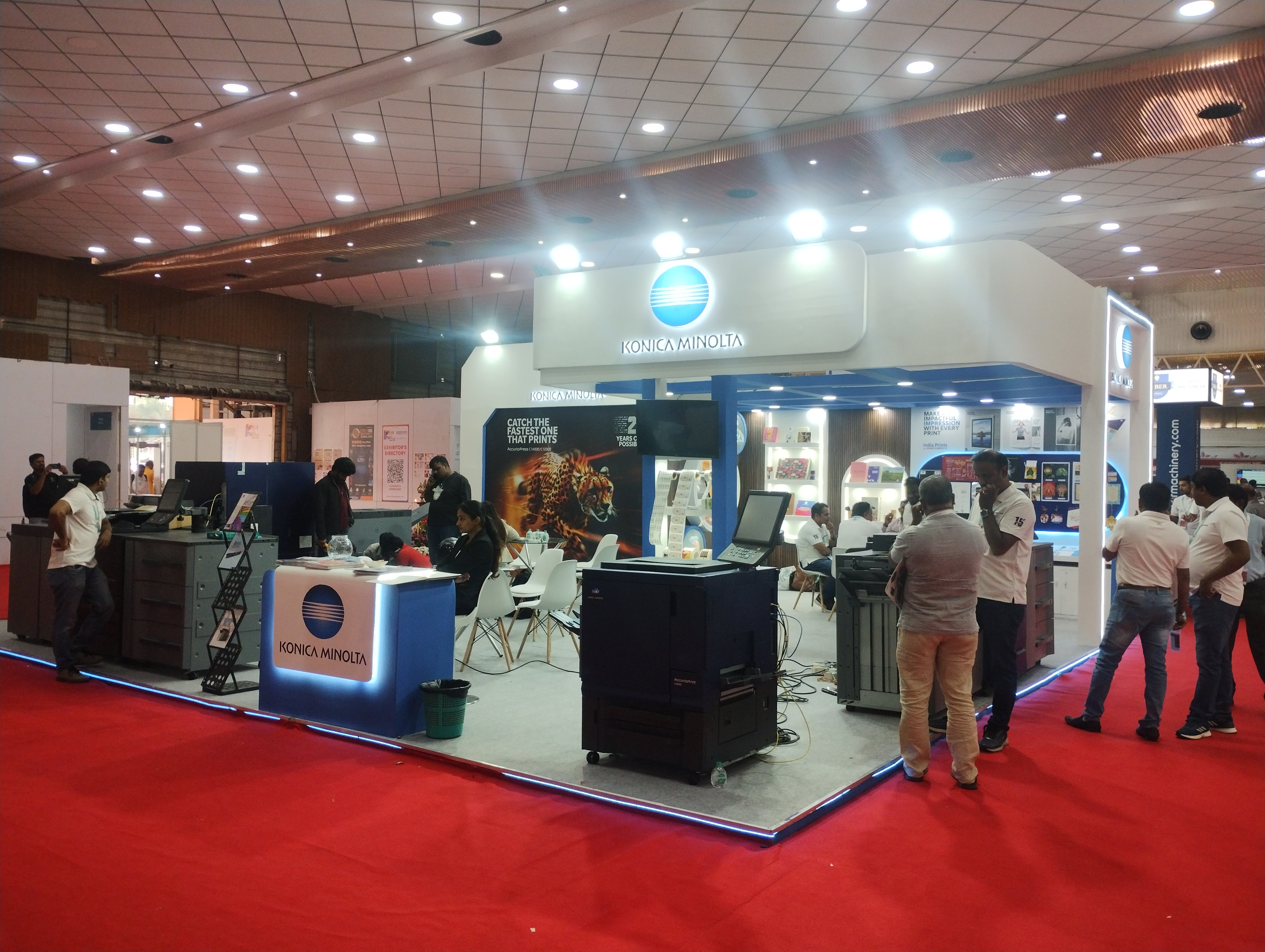
Konica Minolta at 8th Print and Pack Tech Expo, Bangalore (2025)

== History ==
=== Company history ===
Konica Minolta was formed by a merger between Japanese imaging firms Konica and Minolta, announced on 7 January 2003 with the corporate structure completing the re-organization in October 2003. Different group companies, such as the operations in the headquarters and national operating companies, began the process around the same time, however the exact dates vary for each group company.

Konica Minolta uses a "Globe Mark" logo that is similar to but slightly different from that of the former company. It also uses the same corporate slogan as the former Minolta company: "The Essentials of Imaging".

On 19 January 2006 the company announced that it was quitting the camera business due to high financial losses. SLR camera service operations were handed over to Sony starting on 31 March 2006 and Sony has continued development of cameras that are compatible with Minolta autofocus lenses. Originally, in the negotiations, Konica Minolta wanted cooperation with Sony in camera equipment production rather than a sell-out deal, but Sony vehemently refused, saying that it would either acquire everything or leave everything that had to do with the camera equipment sector of KM. Konica Minolta withdrew from the photography business on 30 September 2006. Three thousand seven hundred employees were laid off.

Konica Minolta closed down its photo imaging division in March 2007. The color film, color paper, photo chemical and digital mini-lab machine divisions have ceased operations. Dai Nippon Printing purchased Konica's Odawara factory, with plans to continue to produce paper under Dai Nippon's brand. CPAC acquired the Konica chemical factory.

Konica expanded its business presence and currently sells its products in the Americas, Asia Pacific, Europe, Middle East and Africa.

=== Camera history ===
==== Manual focus 35mm film SLRs ====
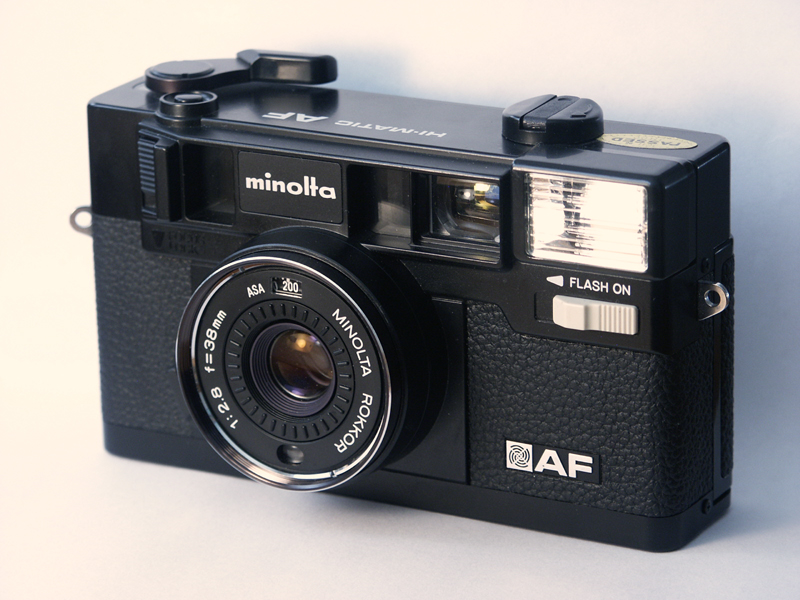
Minolta Hi-Matic auto focus

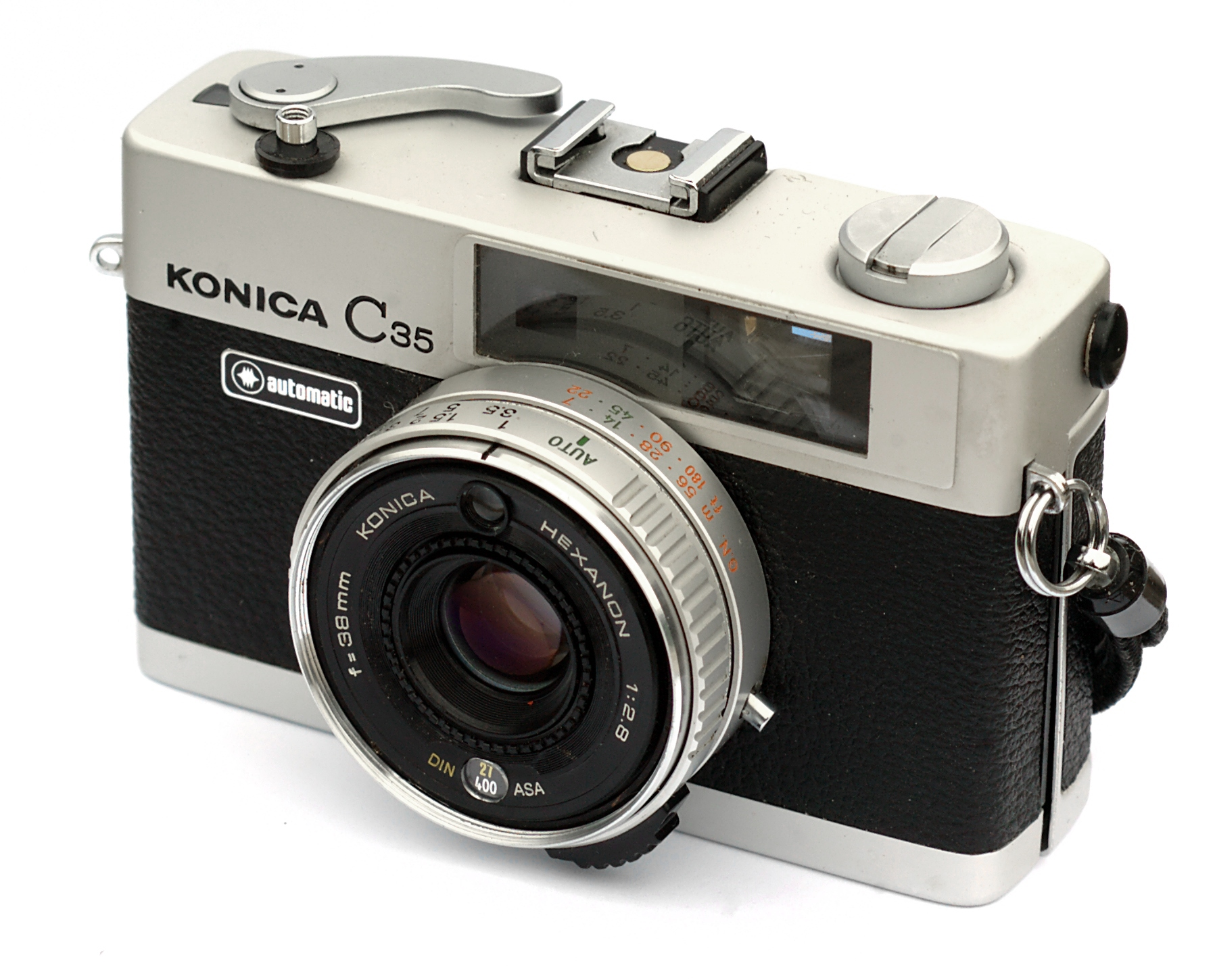
Konica C35 Automatic

Konica and Minolta have been competitors in the 35 mm SLR market since the development of the manual-focus (MF) SRT and other models in the mid-1960s. Minolta positioned most of its cameras to compete in the amateur market, though it did produce a very high quality MF SLR in the XD-11. Konica left the SLR market in 1987. Minolta's last MF SLR cameras were the X370 and X700. Shanghai Optical Co. (Seagull) purchased tools and production plant from Minolta at different times, making some X300 series for Minolta branding, and continues to release MD mount film SLRs compatible with the old system under the Seagull name.

==== Autofocus 35mm film SLRs ====
Until the sale of Konica Minolta's Photo Imaging unit to Sony in 2006, Konica Minolta produced the former Minolta range of 35 mm autofocus single-lens reflex cameras, variously named "Minolta Maxxum" in North America, "Minolta Dynax" in Europe, and "Minolta Alpha" in Japan and the rest of Asia. This range was introduced in 1985 with the Minolta Maxxum 7000, and culminated with the professional Maxxum 9 (1997) later made in a titanium body (9Ti) and technically advanced 7 (1999). The final Minolta 35 mm SLR AF cameras were the Maxxum 50 and 70 (Dynax 40 and 60), built in China.

==== Digital cameras ====
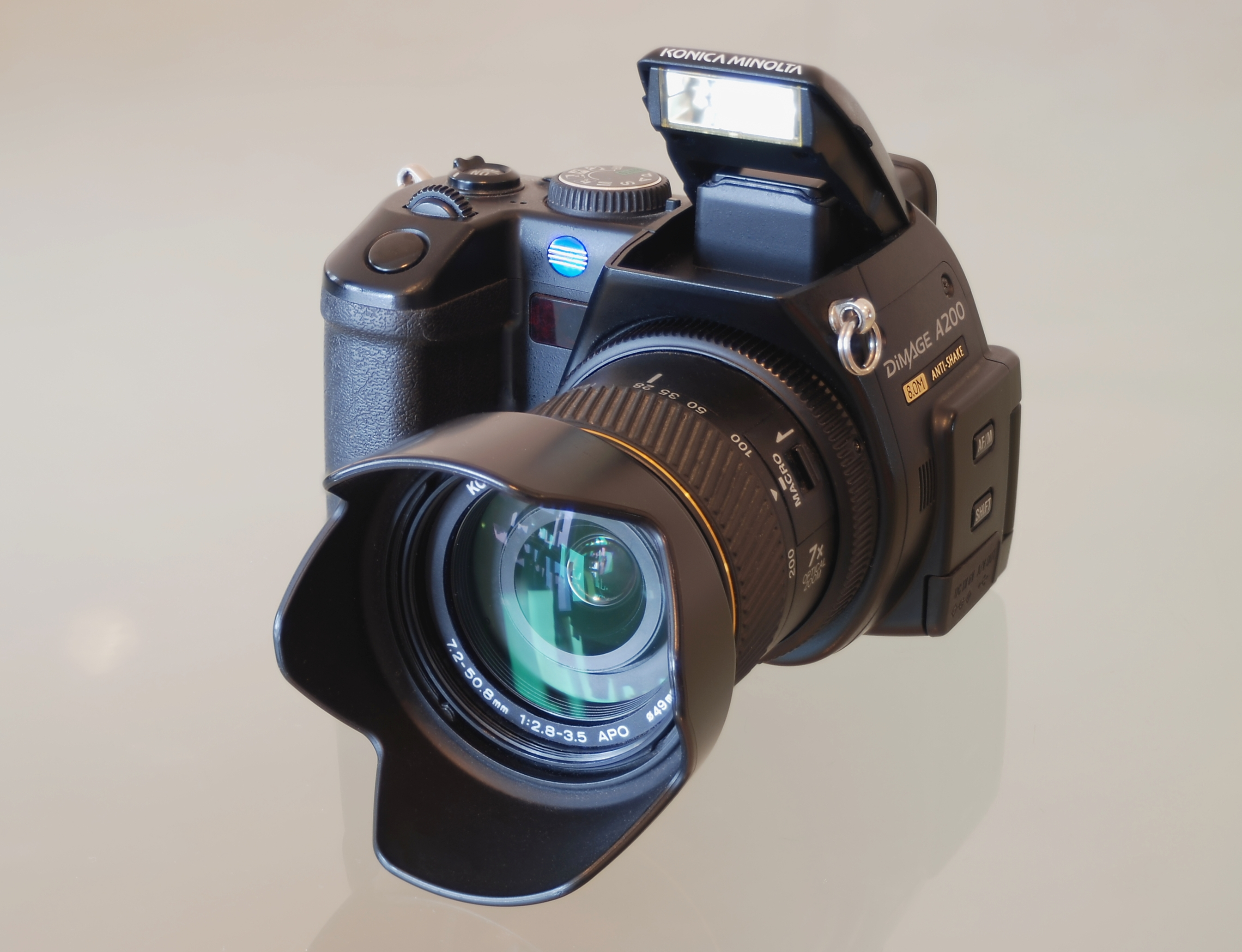
The DiMAGE A200, a bridge-type camera, the most sophisticated digital camera made by Konica Minolta

Konica Minolta had a line of digital point and shoot cameras to compete in the digital photography market. Their Dimage line (originally styled as Dimâge, later as DiMAGE) included digital cameras and imaging software as well as film scanners.

They created a new category of "SLR-like" cameras with the introduction of the DiMAGE 7 and DiMAGE 5. These cameras mixed many of the features of a traditional SLR camera with the special abilities of a digital camera. They had a mechanical zoom ring and electronic focus ring on the lens barrel and used an electronic viewfinder (EVF) showing 100 per cent of the lens view. They added many high level features such as a histogram and made the cameras TTL-compatible with Minolta's final generation of flashes for film SLRs. The controls were designed to be used by people familiar with SLR cameras, however the manual zoom auto-focus lens was not interchangeable. The model 5 had a 1/1.8-inch sensor with 3.3 megapixels, and the fixed zoom was equal to a 35–250 mm (relative to 24×36mm format). The DiMAGE 7, later 7i, 7Hi and A1 had 5-megapixel sensors for which the same lens provided 28–200 mm equivalent coverage. The later A2 and A200 increased the sensor resolution to 8 megapixels. The DiMAGE 5 and 7 original models were more sensitive to infrared light than later models, which incorporated more aggressive IR sensor filters, so have become popular for infrared photography.

The DiMAGE A1/A2/A200 integrated a sensor-based, piezoelectrically actuated anti-camera-shake system. Before the closure of the Photo Imaging unit, the DiMAGE lineup included the long-zoom Z line, the E/G lines (the G series finally incorporating former Konica models), the thin/light X line, and the advanced A line.

The DiMAGE G500 was a five-megapixel compact digital camera manufactured by Konica Minolta in 2003. It came in a stainless steel case, 3x zoom lens with a retractable barrel, and dual Secure Digital and MagicGate card slots. The camera has a 1.3-second startup time.

==== Digital SLRs ====
Minolta made some early forays into digital SLRs with the RD-175 in 1995 and the Minolta Dimâge RD 3000 in 1999 but were the last of the large camera manufacturers to launch a successful digital SLR camera using a current 35 mm AF mount in late 2004. The RD-175 was based on the Maxxum/Dynax 505si 35 mm film SLR and used three different ½-inch CCD image sensors—two for green and one for red and blue—supplied with images by a light splitting mechanism using prisms mounted behind the lens. The RD 3000 used Minolta V-mount APS format lenses and again used multiple CCDs—this time two 1.5 MP ½-inch sensors stitched to give a 2.7 MP output image.

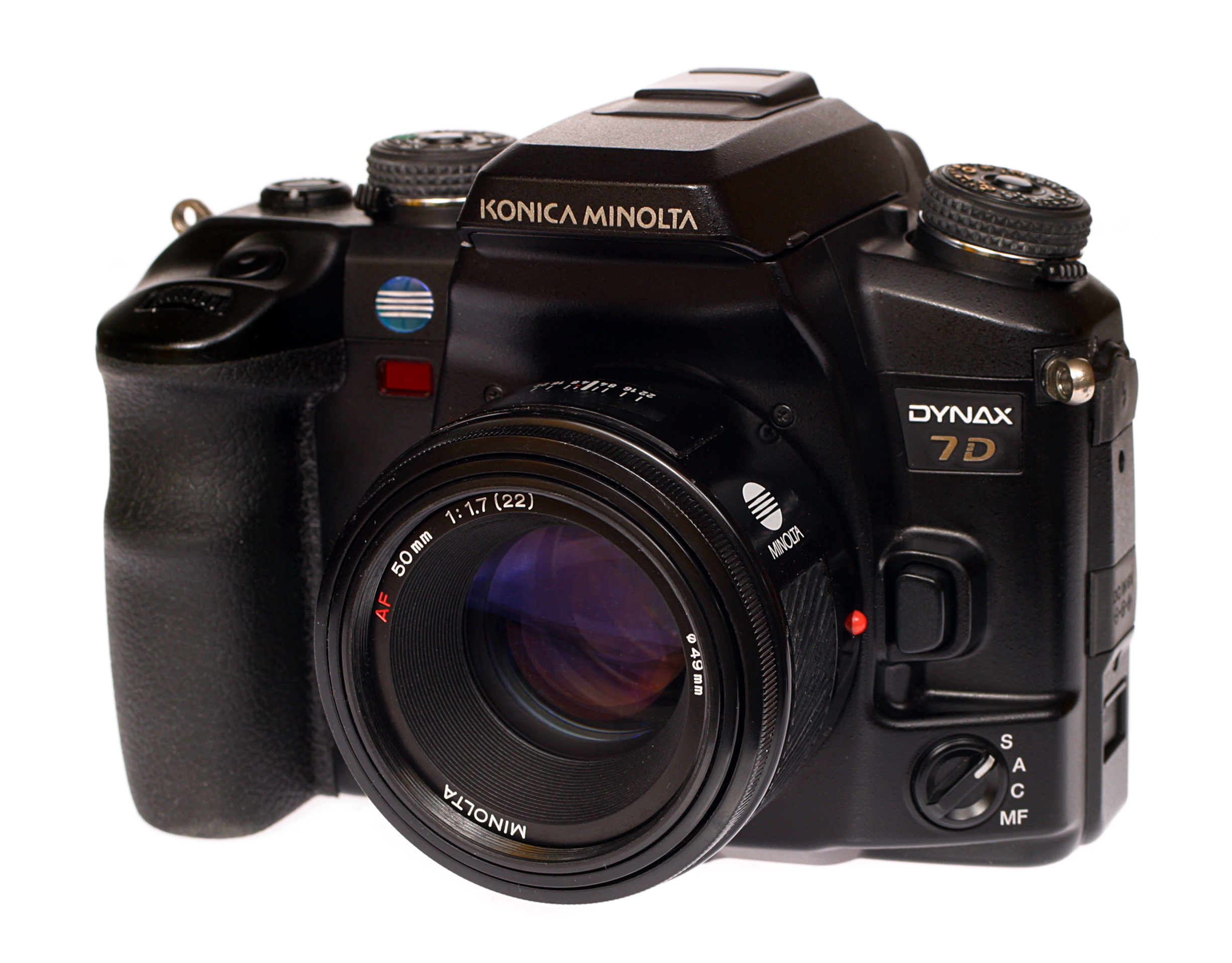
Digital Dynax 7D by Konica Minolta

It was not until late 2004 (after the merger with Konica) that it launched the Dynax/Maxxum/α 7D, a digital SLR based on the very successful Dynax/Maxxum 7 35 mm SLR body. The unique feature of this camera is that it features an in-body Anti-Shake system to compensate for camera shake. However, by 2004 Canon and Nikon had a whole range of digital SLR cameras and many serious photographers had already switched, thus leading Konica Minolta to withdraw from the market and transfer assets to Sony. The only two Konica Minolta digital SLRs to reach production before the company's withdrawal were the Dynax/Maxxum 7D and the Dynax/Maxxum 5D (which is an entry-level model that shared the 7D's sensor and Anti-Shake technology).

In early 2006 Sony announced its Sony α (Alpha) line of digital SLRs, (based on Konica Minolta technology) and stated it was scheduled to launch production in the summer of 2006. The Sony Alpha 100, announced on 6 June 2006, is generally agreed to have been a Konica Minolta design based on the 5D with minimal Sony input. The range of 21 Sony lenses announced at that time also included only revisions of earlier Minolta designs, or models which had been in development, rebadged and with minor cosmetic changes. The Sony Alpha DSLR range utilizing the 'A'-mount has remained compatible with all Minolta AF system lenses, and most accessories, from 1985 onwards.

In 2000 Minolta announced the introduction of Super Sonic Motor (SSM) focusing to a limited number of new lenses. This dispensed with a mechanical drive between camera and lens, but only SLRs made from 1999 onwards (the Dynax/Maxxum 7 and later) were compatible, the professional Dynax 9 requiring a factory upgrade to operate. Sony announced a program in 2008 to fit more future lenses with SSM and these designs may, therefore, not be compatible with 1985–1999 SLR bodies.

=== Business equipment history ===
==== Multifunctional devices ====
For some time after the merger between Konica and Minolta, both product lines continued to be sold, while research and development efforts were underway to create new products. The first Konica Minolta badged products were almost entirely "Konica" or "Minolta" products however, as they were the next generation products being produced by both companies before the merger. These products included MFPs such as the Konica Minolta bizhub C350 (a "Minolta" design, also badged as the Konica 8022 and Minolta CF2203), and Konica Minolta 7235 (A "Konica" design).

Successive models included greater integration between the two sets of technologies, and current products such as the bizhub C451 (pictured below in this article) contain many technologies from both histories. Some products such as the bizhub 501 are more noticeably an engine design from one company rather the other, however the system itself, including operation, features and RIP technologies are in the "new style" that holds little legacy from either former company.

As with many MFP manufacturers, some of the market segments are not produced directly by the manufacturer. In Konica Minolta's case, many smaller SOHO MFP products (such as the bizhub 130f, wearing Minebea marks in hardware and in software drivers) are produced by third parties. By the same token, many other companies also re-badge Konica Minolta products under OEM agreements.

==== Printers ====
As the printer operations of the former Konica company were limited to "printer models" of MFP models, or re-badged printers from other manufacturers, while the printer operations of the former Minolta company were strong since the purchase of QMS (completed in 2000 after increasing influence and shareholding by Minolta), printer operations were initially not affected greatly by the Konica Minolta merger. In the 1980s QMS made the KISS laser printer, the most inexpensive then available at $1995.

Due to the increased complexity of both MFP and printer devices, Konica Minolta increased technology sharing between the two lines of products. In many regions, this has led to the integration of the Printer products company into the Business equipment products company.

== Business companies ==
Konica Minolta has spun off business units into separate companies.

=== Konica Minolta Business Technologies, Inc. ===
The Konica Minolta Business Technologies division develops multifunction printers, copiers, computer printers, facsimile machines, microfilm systems and related supplies. The divisional head office is in Tokyo, with regional offices in Worldwide headquarters are also located in: Germany (Konica Minolta Europe), USA (Konica Minolta Business Solutions USA), New Zealand (Konica Minolta Business Solutions New Zealand), Australia (Konica Minolta Australia) and China (Konica Minolta China). These headquarters are responsible for sales and support of the Konica Minolta companies in each country within their region, including distributors and the dealer networks. In an effort to improve profitability in a declining printer market, Konica Minolta Business Solutions begins to acquire enterprise content management (ECM) service and software solution providers.

The division has approximately 19,600 employees.

==== Multi-functional peripherals (MFPs) ====
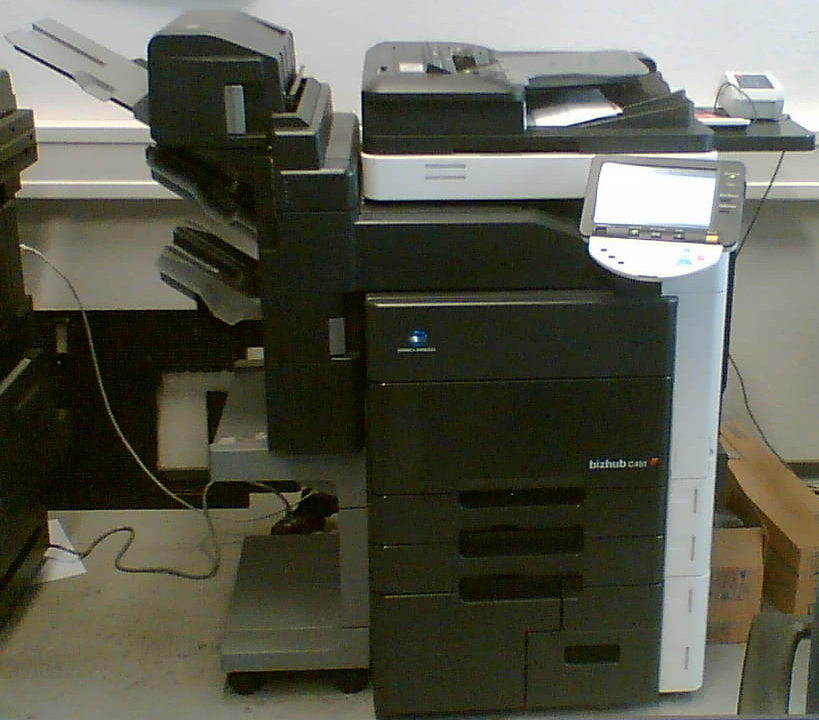
A Konica Minolta bizhub C451 MFP with an attached finisher

Pursuing advanced imaging markets Konica Minolta's digital multi-functional peripherals (MFPs), branded the "bizhub" series, are equipped with multiple functions (copying, printing, faxing, scanning), and can integrate into any corporate network environments. They allow users to consolidate the administration of office equipment connected to a network by using a series of network management software programs and even to manage and share both scanned data and computer-generated data.

==== Konica Minolta Printing Solutions ====
Advanced generation of compact, lightweight and high-performance color laser printers. The market for color laser printers continues to expand, fuelled by the rapid shift of business documents from monochrome to color. Konica Minolta's color laser printers—branded the "Magicolor" series and using toner technology inherited from QMS/Qume include what was then the world's smallest and lightest color laser printer with 2400 dpi photographic quality, the Magicolor 2430DL of 2005. This printer also offered direct output from digital cameras using PictBridge and EXIFII Print Order Management technology, via USB. The Magicolor series covers from entry level home/office models like the 2430s successors, to large print stations for corporate environments.

As of May 2007 Printing Solutions (Europe) business was merged with Konica Minolta Business Solutions (Europe) as part of radical reforms within the company.

=== Konica Minolta Opto, Inc. ===
Konica Minolta Opto, Inc. develops optical components, units, and systems.

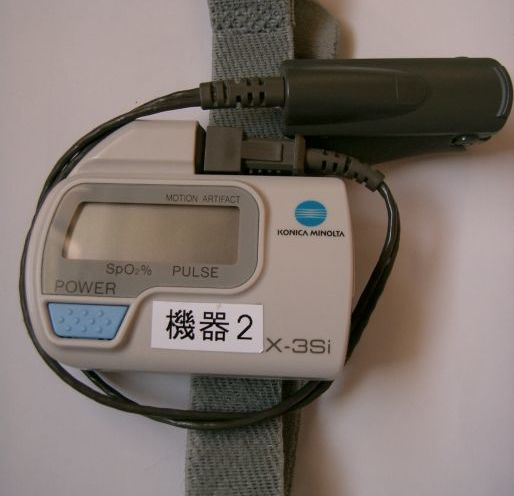
Konica Minolta PULSOX-3Si

=== Konica Minolta Medical & Graphic, Inc. ===
Konica Minolta Medical & Graphic, Inc. is involved in the manufacturing, sale, and related services of film and processing equipment for medical and graphic imaging. The company is located in Grand Rapids, MI, and manufactures and distributes both conventional and digital graphic arts supplies including: analog and digital films, graphics arts papers, conventional and CTP printing plates, processing chemicals, film and plate processors, imagesetters, platesetters, digital color proofers and software. The company serves the printing and publishing, corporate communications and newspaper industries.

=== Konica Minolta Sensing, Inc. ===
Konica Minolta Sensing offer products, software, and services utilizing light control and measurement technology within four main product areas: Color Measurement, Display Measurement, 3D measurement and Medical Measurement.

- Color Measurement: Spectrophotometers and tristimulus colorimeters (Chroma Meters) for measuring reflected and transmitted color of objects. These are used in industrial fields and other areas for color quality control, grading by color, and CCM applications on a wide variety of subjects, including automotive parts, paint, plastic, textiles, construction materials and foods, and correcting vision problems.
- Spectroscopy: Spectroscopy equipment for laboratory and scientific work across the uv/visible/nir spectrum. Spectroscopy equipment can be used for restoring aged or ancient artwork, analyzing the color of food and beverages, and measuring blood alcohol content.
- Display Measurement: Display colour analysers, spectral colorimeters, and spectral radiometers for testing display performance and quality, examining and adjusting white balance and contrast, and precisely measuring display chroma, brightness and balance. Subjects include various types of TVs and computer displays (plasma, LCD), as well as other displays (mobile phones, digital cameras, car navigation equipment).
- 3D Measurement: 3D digitizers scan three-dimensional objects and import the 3D data to computers. The data can be used for medical applications, academic research, 3D archiving, archeological studies, and computer graphics production, as well as for industrial applications such as reverse engineering, design verification, and quality inspection.
- Medical Measurement: Products for non-invasive measurements of physiological values. These include pulse oximeters which determines oxygen saturation in the blood and compact jaundice meters that can test newborn babies for jaundice without taking blood samples.

=== Konica Minolta Healthcare Americas, Inc ===
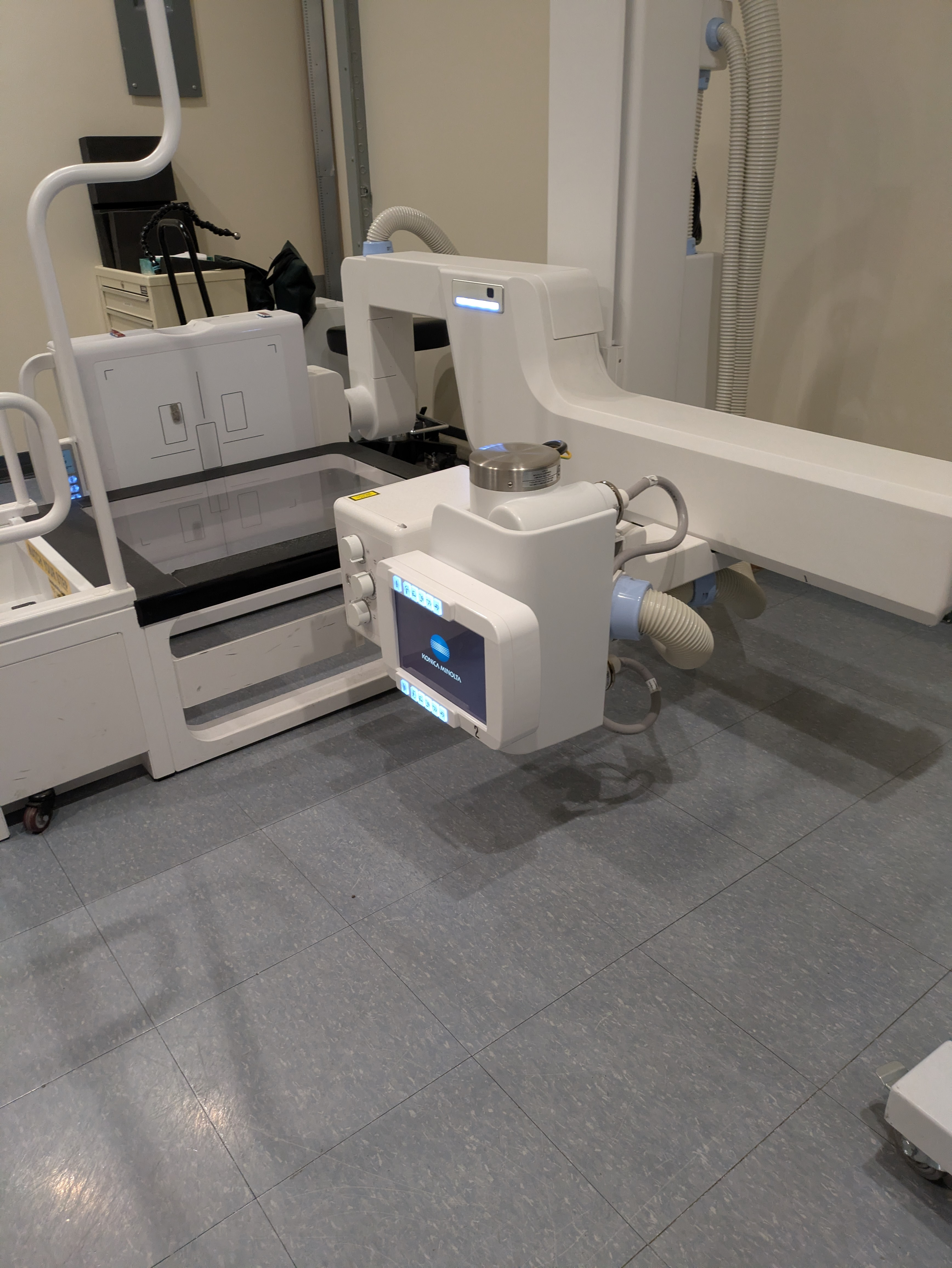
A Konica Minolta digital radiography machine

Konica Minolta Healthcare Americas, Inc., formerly known as Konica Minolta Medical Imaging USA, Inc., is a business unit of Konica Minolta, Inc., and is headquartered in Wayne, NJ. The unit provides digital radiography, ultrasound imaging, healthcare IT and services to hospitals, imaging centers, clinics and private practices across the US, Canada and Latin America.

In July 2017, the company acquired Aliso Viejo, California-based genetic testing firm Ambry Genetics, for a reported US$1 billion.

=== Print shops (Kinko's Japan and Kinko's Korea) ===
In 2012, Konica Minolta bought the Japanese operations of FedEx Kinko's. The deal consisted of the sale of 61 printing offices across Japan. Subsequently, in 2013, Konica Minolta bought FedEx Kinko's operations in South Korea. The Kinko's operations in both countries were later rebranded to remove a reference to FedEx, but retained the Kinko's name.

In Japan, the Kinko's stores in Kyushu, Chugoku and Shikoku regions are continued to be operated by GA Creous, a subsidiary of General Asahi.

== Sponsorships ==
Konica Minolta's sponsorships include:

- CNN Heroes (2014 Oct - 2014 Dec)
- Redlands Konica Minolta Art Prize (1996–present)
- Wayne Taylor Racing #10 in the IMSA SportsCar Championship (2014-Present)

== See also ==
- Tower Hotel (Niagara Falls), previously called "Minolta Tower"
