= The Super Girl =

- from top left to bottom right; Akiko Hyuga, Yōko Nogiwa, Emi Shindo, Reiko Itsuki, Naomi Tanaka, Rei Maki, Jun Izumi
- Also known as: Supergirl
- Starring: Yōko Nogiwa; Janet Hatta; Linda Yamamoto; Rei Maki; Jun Izumi; Reiko Itsuki; Naomi Tanaka; Emi Shindō; Akiko Hyūga; Kanichi Tani
- Narrated by: Tadashi Nakamura
- Theme music composer: Kōji Makaino
- Ending theme: Magical Night sung by Kumiko Kaori
- Composer: Kōji Makaino
- Country of origin: Japan
- Original language: Japanese
- No. of episodes: 51

Production
- Production company: Toei Company

Original release
- Network: Tokyo Channel 12
- Release: April 2, 1979 – March 17, 1980

The Super Girl (ザ・スーパーガール, Za Sūpāgāru; sometimes referred to as Supergirl) television series is a Japanese crime drama. Originally broadcast between April 2, 1979, and March 17, 1980, lasting 51 episodes, the series featured an all-female cast, not unlike the earlier series Playgirl. Supergirl, however, was primarily based upon the American television series Charlie's Angels and the softcore pornography films produced by Nikkatsu.

== Similarities ==
Despite the superficial similarities, Supergirl is vastly different from Playgirl. Featuring far more serious plots and less comic relief, as well as highly eroticised situations wherein the characters wore a variety of revealing and fetish outfits, including bikinis and schoolgirl uniforms, these elements of the series were a deliberate attempt by its producer Toei to create a more "adult" series. This can even be seen in the episode titles, such as episode one, "Seven Sexy Cats Make Their Explosive Debut", or episode nineteen, "Nude Battle Against the Wolf Pack".

== Characters and cast ==
The main characters of the series are members of "SG7" (short for Super Girl Seven), an all-female detective agency. Their leader was portrayed by Yōko Nogiwa; the other primary actors in the series are Janet Hatta, Linda Yamamoto, Rei Maki, Reiko Itsuki, Jun Izumi, Naomi Tanaka, Emi Shindo, and Akiko Hyuga.

- Yuko Hirose (Yoko Nogiwa) cool-headed leader
- Ritsuko Emoto (Janet Hatta) field commander (episodes 1-25)
- Mari Fujimura (Linda Yamamoto) intelligence gatherer and informant (episodes 1-24, 26, 32, 39)
- Rie Hase (Rei Maki) wild cat
- Kaoru Sakaki (Reiko Itsuki) cry baby
- Mika Shiraishi (Jun Izumi) troublemaker
- Etsuko Namiki (Naomi Tanaka) youngest
- Noriko Hayakawa (Emi Shindo) undercover specialist (from episode 26)
- Mayumi Mizuki (Akiko Hyuga) sukeban (juvenile) idol (from episode 26)
- Chief Detective Komada (Kanichi Tani) Former boss of Yuko Hirose
