= Juri Manase =

Japanese actress (born 1975)

- Born: 1 January 1975 (age 51); Tokyo, Japan
- Occupation: Actress
- Parents: Sonny Chiba (father); Yōko Nogiwa (mother)
- Relatives: Jirō Yabuki (uncle); Mackenyu (half-brother); Gordon Maeda (half-brother)

Juri Manase (真瀬 樹里, Manase Juri; born 1 January 1975), also known as Julie Manase, is a Japanese actress.

== Early life ==
Juri was inspired to be an actress at the age five by seeing her parents (Sonny Chiba and Yōko Nogiwa) on sets and stage. While she was in school, she took lessons in many types of arts, sports subjects to acquire a wide range of skills to become a versatile actress. Throughout her secondary school years, she was a member of the English acting club. After graduation, she studied acting at Nippon University and was a member of the university Tate (Japanese sword-action) club.

== Career ==
She began her acting career in 1994, in the same year landing a significant role by auditioning for a movie called "ButouhaJingi -Kanketsuhen-" She then appeared in several TV series, movies and plays in Japan. In 1998, Juri was praised in her role as a guest lead in an NHK TV series about Samurai called “Terakoya Yume Shinan.” Her career extended overseas when in 2002 she was invited to the US to teach 'Tate' (Japanese stage combat) to the leads in Quentin Tarantino's "Kill Bill." Along the way, she was offered the role of a "Crazy 88". The director asked her to be Lucy Liu's stunt double for a few takes due to her level of expertise in Tate and Japanese traditional dance. In 2007, she landed a role as a Shinobi (Ninja) in the NHK Taiga Drama Fūrin Kazan. Her performance as well as her expertise in sword-action fascinated the viewers.

== Filmography ==
=== Film ===
Year	Title	Role	Notes
1994	Shoot!		
1994	ButouhaJingi -Kanketsuhen-	Azusa (Supporting)	
1994	Iruka ni Aeruhi	Manami (Supporting)	
2003	Kill Bill: Volume 1	Crazy 88	Assistant Sword Trainer
	SAKURA	Kaede (Supporting)	Shot in 2004 (to be determined)
2004	Kill Bill: The Whole Bloody Affair	Crazy 88	Assistant Sword Trainer
2006	A DAY IN THE LIFE	Miki Sagara	

=== Television ===
- Watashi no Unmei - Series Regular - (1994–1995)
- Inochi no Genba kara 3 - Series Regular - (1995)
- Ai toha Kesshite Koukai shinaikoto - Series Regular - (1996)
- Hitorigurashi - Series Regular - (1996)
- Oryourigakkou Satsujinjiken - Supporting - (1997)
- Hyouen – Recurring Guest - (1997)
- Terakoya Yume Shinan / episode 18 - Guest Star - (1998)
- OryouriGakkou Satsujinjiken 2 - Supporting - (1998)
- Shichinin no OL Sommelier - Supporting - (1998)
- Kamiyui Isaji - Guest Star - (1999)
- Kyoto Meikyuu Annai - Guest - (1999)
- Good News - Series Regular - (1999)
- Kanojyotachi no Jidai - Series Regular - (1999)
- Kids War - Series Regular - (1999)
- Aoitori Syndrome - Series Regular - (1999)
- Big Wing - Series Regular - (2001)
- Kyoto Meikyuu Annai 3 - Series Regular - (2001)
- Gekai Saeki Makoto no Satsujin Karute - Supporting - (2001)
- Jigokuno Hanayome 2 - Supporting - (2001)
- Kabegiwa Zeimukan (2001)
- Jittenin / episode 9 - Guest - (2001)
- Kyoto Meikyuu Annai 'Special' (2001)
- Red - Recurring Guest - (2001)
- Gokenin Zankuro - Guest Star - (2002)
- Kyoto Meikyuu Annai 4 - Series Regular - (2002)
- Karuta Queen - Series Regular - (2003)
- Kyoto Meikyuu Annai 5 - Series Regular - (2003)
- Daisuki! Itsutsugo 5 - Series Regular - (2003)
- Misshitsu no Nukeana (2003)
- ' Travel Show Tabi no Kaori, Toki no Asobi ' - France - (2004)
- JikenTyousain, Nanjou Makoto - Guest Star - (2004)
- Jikou (2004)
- Tetsudou Keisatsukan, Kiyomura Kouzaburou (2005)
- OnnaKeiji Mizuki - Series Regular - (2005)
- Tetsudou Keisatsukan, Kiyomura Kouzaburou 2 (2006)
- Tetsudou Keisatsukan, Kiyomura Kouzaburou 3 (2006)
- Tetsudou Keisatsukan, Kiyomura Kouzaburou 4 (2007)
- Tetsudou Keisatsukan, Kiyomura Kouzaburou 5 (2007)
- Fūrin Kazan - Series Regular - (NHK / Taiga Drama) (2007)
- OnnaKeiji Mizuki 2 - Series Regular - (2007)
- Tetsudou Keisatsukan, Kiyomura Kouzaburou 6 (2008)
- Totto-chan! (2017), as Yōko Nogiwa
