= Konica Minolta Dimage A2 =

DiMAGE A2
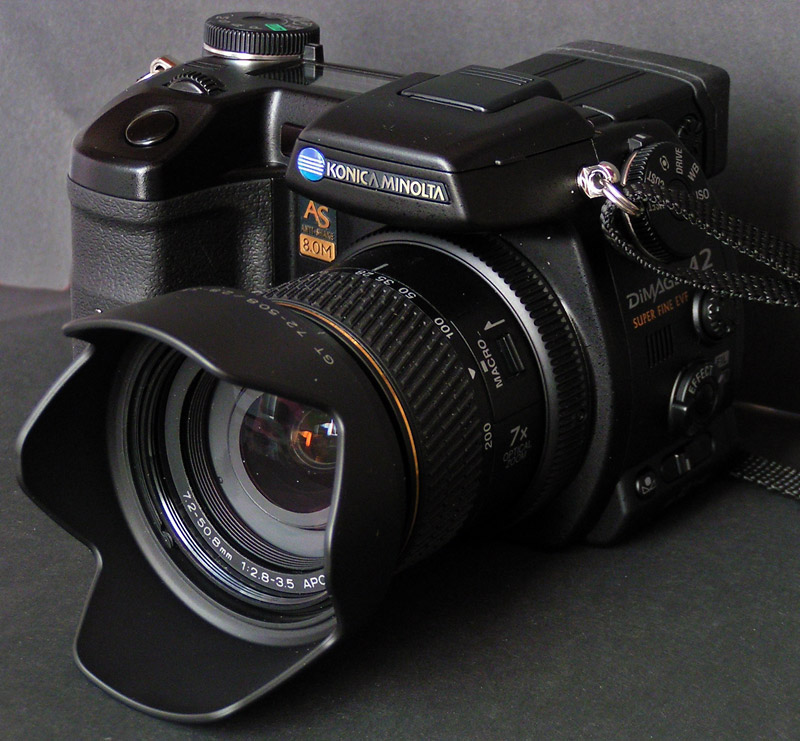

Overview
- Maker: Konica Minolta
- Released: February 12, 2004

Lens
- Lens: fixed, 7.2–50.8 mm (28–200 equiv.) 16e/13g
- F-numbers: f/2.8–3.5

Sensor/medium
- Sensor type: CCD
- Sensor size: 2/3"
- Maximum resolution: 3264 × 2448
- Recording medium: CompactFlash Types I, II (FAT32)

Focusing
- Focus: AF, manual

Exposure/metering
- Exposure: Auto, manual
- Exposure bracketing: ±2.0 EV
- Exposure modes: P, A, S, M
- Metering modes: Multi-segment, center-weighted, spot

Flash
- Flash: Built-in

Shutter
- Shutter speed range: 30 – 1/4000

Viewfinder
- Electronic viewfinder: 922,000 dots, tilting
- Frame coverage: 100%

General
- LCD screen: 1.8", tilting
- Battery: NP-400 Li-ion, 7.4 V / 1500 mAh
- Optional battery packs: BP-400
- Dimensions: 117×85×114 mm (4.6×3.3×4.5 in)
- Weight: 565 g (19.9 oz)

Chronology
- Replaced: DiMAGE A1
- Successor: DiMAGE A200

The Konica Minolta DiMAGE A2 is a digital bridge camera which was manufactured by Konica Minolta, announced at the Photo Marketing Association exposition on February 12, 2004, as the flagship of Konica Minolta's fixed-lens DiMAGE digital camera line. It was similar to and succeeded the Minolta DiMAGE A1 (2003) and was supplemented by the DiMAGE A200 (2004) prior to Konica Minolta selling off its camera division to Sony in 2006.

== Specifications ==
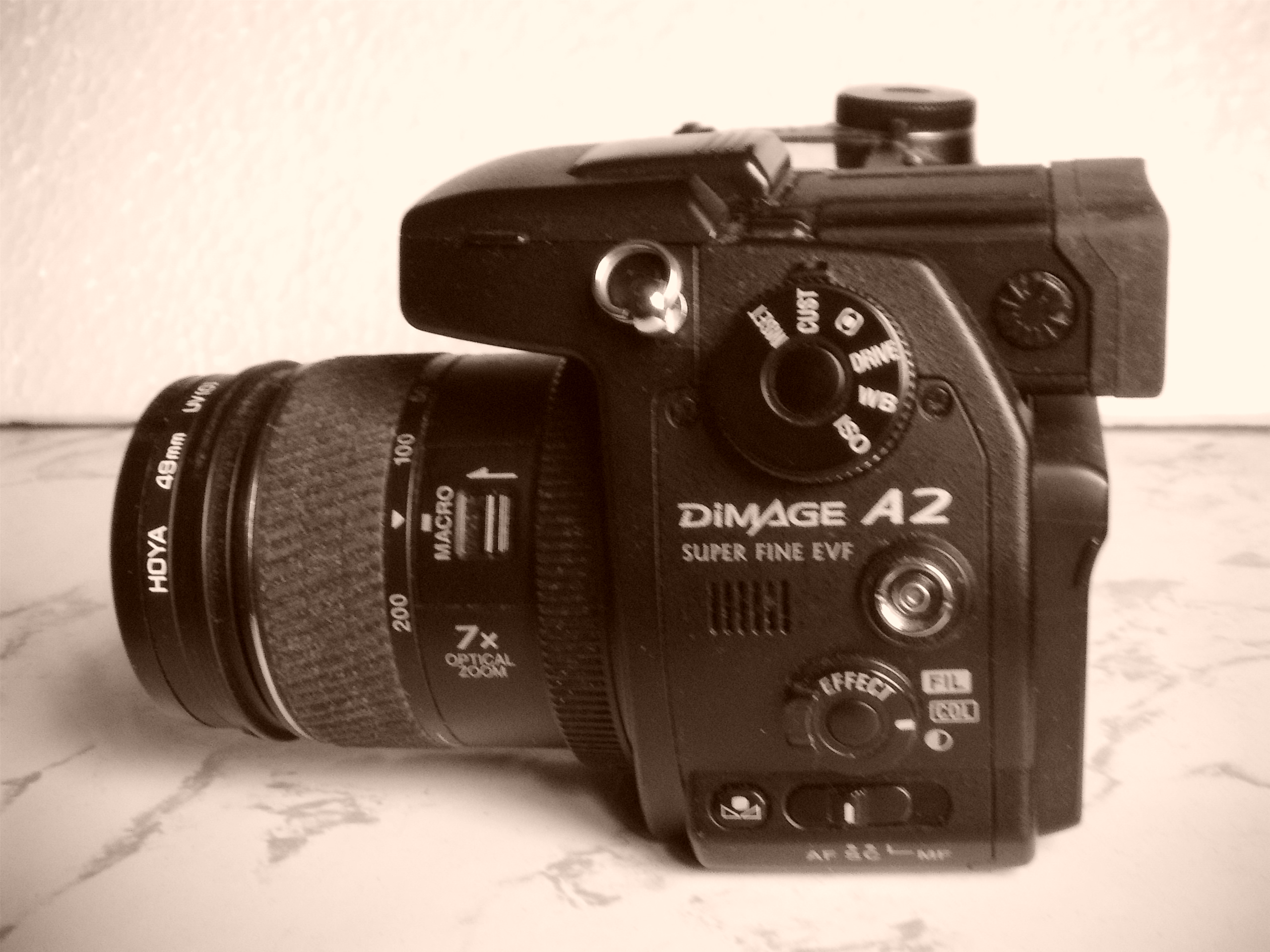
Left side of the DiMAGE A2

The Konica Minolta DiMAGE A2 is a discontinued, 8 megapixel CCD digital camera. The A2's features include time lapse options, a 922,000 pixel electronic viewfinder, an articulating rear 1.8 inch screen, and a non-interchangeable, mechanically operated 7× zoom lens.

The flagship line of Minolta (and later, Konica Minolta) DiMAGE cameras with electronic viewfinders and sharing the same 7.2–50.8 mm Minolta GT lens included:

- DiMAGE 7 / DiMAGE 5 (2001)
- DiMAGE 7i (2002)
- DiMAGE 7Hi (2002)
- DiMAGE A1 (2003)
- DiMAGE A2 (2004)
- DiMAGE A200 (2004)

The A1 was the first digital camera with a sensor-shift image stabilization system, rather than a moving optical element. The A2 was largely identical to the A1 but provided several key upgrades, including a sensor with higher resolution (8 MP versus 5), upgraded electronic viewfinder resolution, and a faster autofocus system. The A200 supplemented but did not replace the A2, as some features were upgraded for the A200, while others were removed.

Sony acquired the Konica Minolta camera line in 2006 and the existing Konica Minolta fixed-lens digital camera line, including the DiMAGE A2, were discontinued. The Konica Minolta A-mount digital single lens reflex cameras (Alpha/Maxxum 7D and 5D) were developed into a new Sony line sold as the Sony Alpha series.
