= Minolta Dimage A1 =

Digital camera model

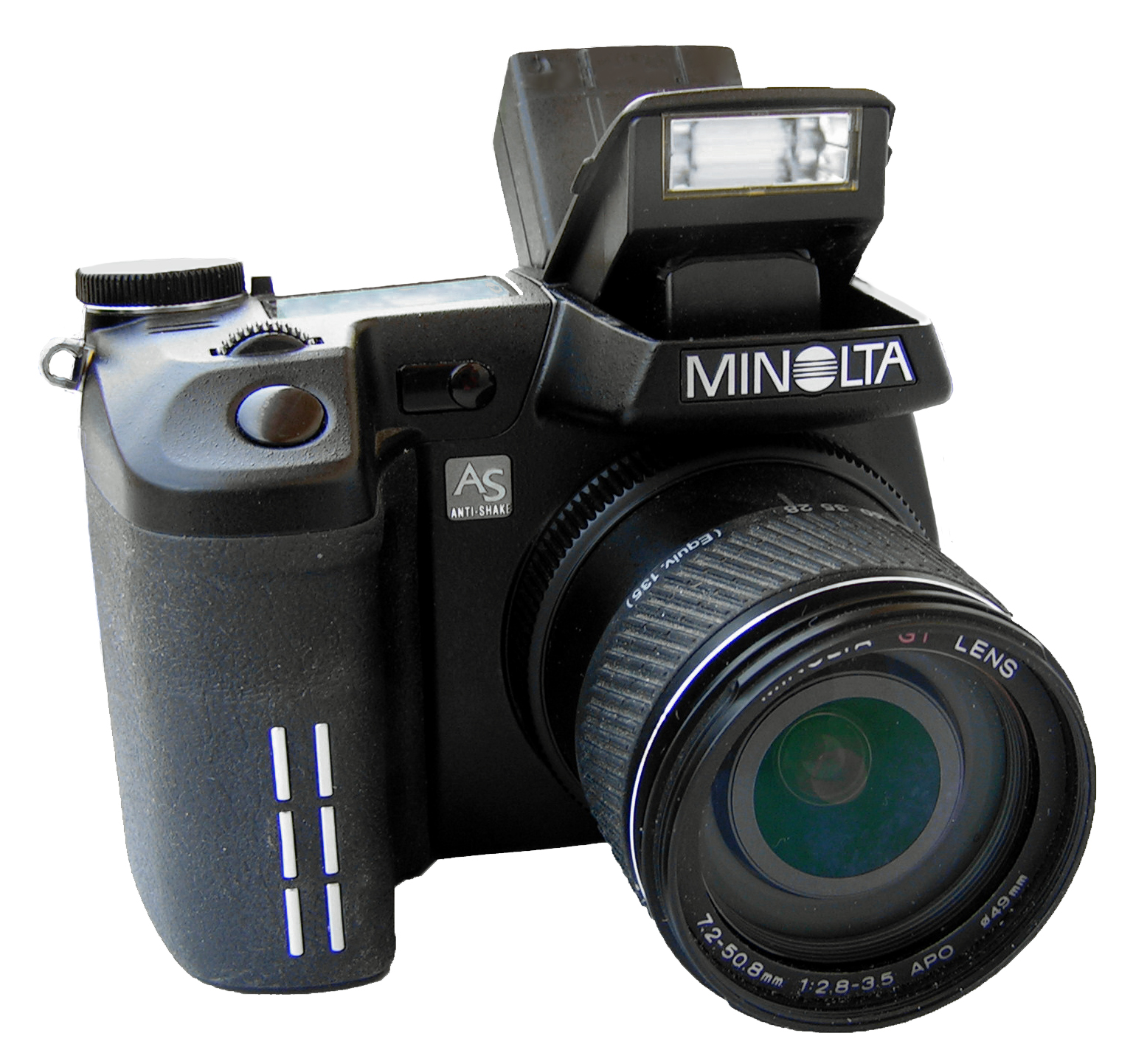
Minolta DiMAGE A1

The Minolta DiMAGE A1 is a 5 megapixel bridge digital camera with electronic viewfinder manufactured by Minolta. It was introduced in July 2003, replacing the Minolta Dimage 7 series. It was the first Minolta product to incorporate the Anti-Shake system, a built-in image stabilization system.

Unlike the DiMAGE 7-series cameras which use four AA batteries or an external battery pack connection, the DiMAGE A1 uses a newly introduced battery cell designated Minolta NP-400. A key feature of it is a long battery life. (The NP-400 is also used with the final Konica Minolta DSLRs, the Dynax 7D/5D).

This was the final Minolta-badged bridge camera product before the Konica Minolta merger. The DiMAGE A1 was succeeded by the DiMAGE A2 in March 2004 (as the first Konica Minolta-badged product), with an 8-megapixel CCD sensor.
