= Minolta =

Former Japanese imaging corporation

Minolta Co., Ltd. ミノルタ
- Type: Private (1928-1949), Public (1949-2003)
- Traded as: TYO 7753 (1949-2003)
- Industry: Manufacturing
- Founded: November 1928; 97 years ago (as Nichi-Doku Shashinki Shōten); Osaka, Japan
- Founder: Kazuo Tashima
- Defunct: August 5, 2003; 23 years ago
- Fate: Merged with Konica into Konica Minolta; Minolta US Photographic trademark abandoned and claimed by JMM Lee Properties LLC (2015)
- Successor: Konica Minolta
- Headquarters: 3-13, 2-chome, Azuchi-Machi, Chuo-ku, Osaka 541-8556, Japan (1998)
- Products: Cameras, film cameras, lenses, camera accessories, photocopiers, fax machines, laser printers

Minolta Co., Ltd. (ミノルタ, Minoruta) was a Japanese manufacturer of cameras, lenses, camera accessories, binoculars, photocopiers, fax machines, and laser printers. Minolta Co., Ltd., which is also known simply as Minolta, was founded in Osaka, Japan, in 1928 as Nichi-Doku Shashinki Shōten (日独写真機商店; meaning Japanese-German camera shop). In 1931, the company adopted Minolta for their cameras, an acronym for the German phrase "Mechanismus, Instrumente, Optik, und Linsen von Tashima". Between 1937 and 1962 they became known as Chiyoda Kōgaku Seikō K.K. (千代田光学精工㈱, meaning Chiyoda Optics and Precision Industry Co., Ltd.) before adopting the Minolta name as their final company iteration. The Minolta 'Rising Sun' logo was designed by Saul Bass in 1981. Minolta made the first integrated autofocus 35mm SLR camera system with the Alpha α/Maxxum 7000/AF in 1985.

In 2003, Minolta merged with Konica to form Konica Minolta. On 19 January 2006, Konica Minolta announced that it was leaving the camera and photo business, and that it would sell a portion of its SLR camera business to Sony as part of its move to pull completely out of the business of selling cameras and photographic film.

Between 2015 and 2016, Konica Minolta lost the rights to the Minolta US trademark for photographic equipment in a trial against JMM Lee Properties LLC, citing Trademark abandonment. Assuming control of several Minolta Trademarks in photographic industries by 2017, JMM Lee began licensing the name to Elite Brands Inc. This is an example of zombie trademarking.

== History ==
=== Cameras & Photography ===
==== Early Cameras ====
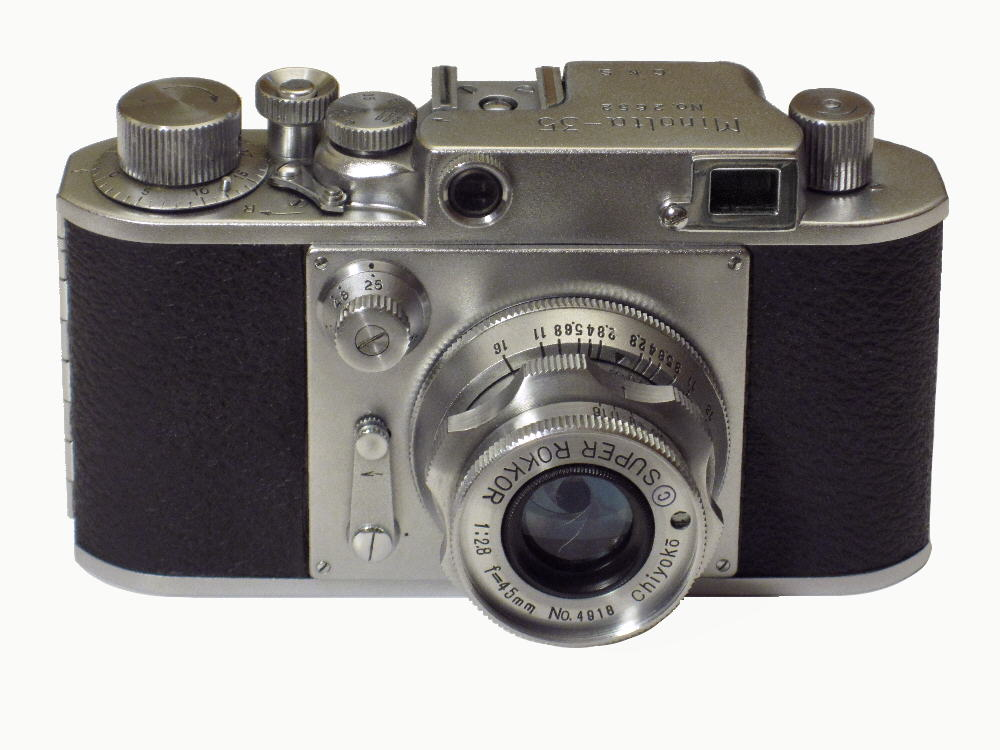
Minolta-35 (1947)

Relying initially on imported German technology, Nichi-Doku turned out their first product, a bellows camera called the Nifcarette, in March 1929. By 1937, the company reorganized as Chiyoda Kogaku Seikō, K.K. (Chiyoda Optics and Fine Engineering, Ltd.) and built the first Japanese-made twin-lens reflex camera, the Minoltaflex, based on German Rolleicord designs.

In 1947, the Minolta-35 was introduced. It is originally based on the Leica LTM rangefinder design, but added significant alterations and improvements. Produced alongside Minolta's own LTM lenses and accessories and using standard 35mm film in cassettes, the standard lens offered was the Super Rokkor 1:2.8 50mm.

In 1950, Minolta developed a planetarium projector, the first made in Japan, beginning the company's connection to astronomical optics. John Glenn took a rebadged Minolta Hi-Matic rangefinder aboard the spacecraft Friendship 7 in 1962, and in 1968, Apollo 8 orbited the Moon with a Minolta Space Meter aboard. This was also used by the Apollo 11 astronauts on the moon.

In the late 1950s and 1960s, Minolta competed in the medium-format roll film camera market with the Autocord series of TLR (twin-lens reflex) cameras. A prototype Medium format SLR-style camera was developed called the 'SR-66', but it never became commercially available, among others.

==== Single-Lens Reflex Cameras ====
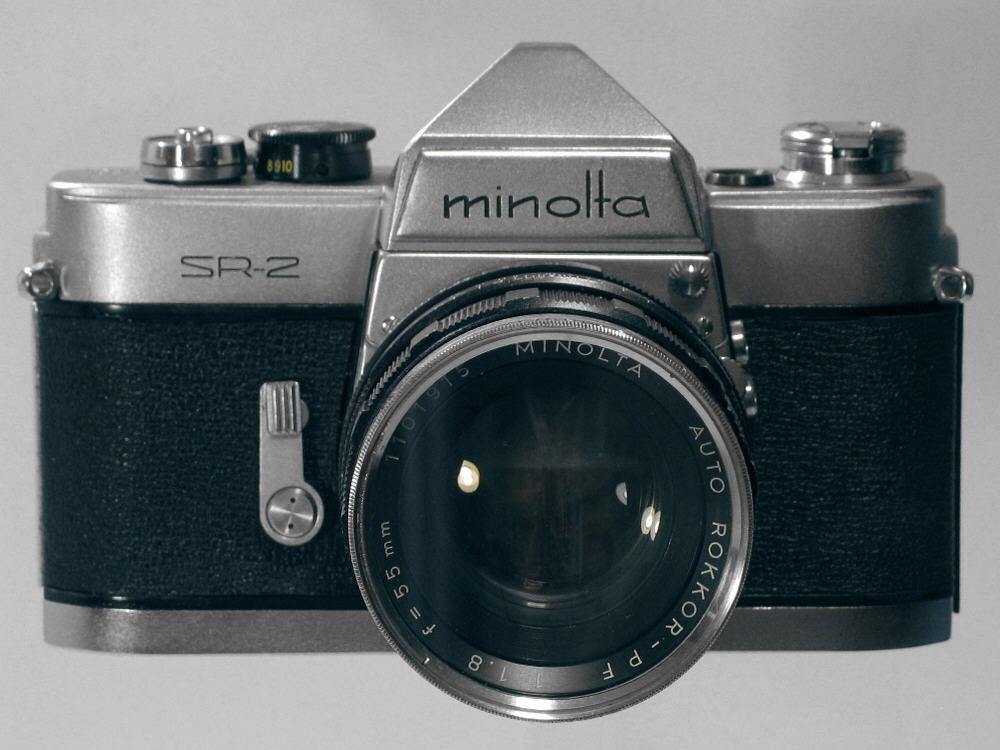
Minolta SR-2 (1958–1960), counter-intuitively Minolta's first 35mm SLR

Minolta was the first Japanese manufacturer to introduce a natively produced bayonet lens mount to its SLRs. In 1958, Minolta introduced its SR-2 single lens reflex 35mm camera, the beginning of the SR-series spanning 17 years of production. In 1966 Minolta introduced their first SR camera with TTL metering, introducing it as the new series 'SR-T'. Minolta cameras were largely targeted towards enthusiasts and amateurs. Albeit regarded as some of the most innovative SLR's of their time, Minolta was often seen less favourably than its professional competition, such as Nikon and Canon. Minolta SLRs were often criticised for lacking or being slow to include professional features, e.g. Motor Drives, interchangeable pentaprisms, and removable backs.. In 1985 Minolta introduced the first commercially successful autofocus SLR line with the Alpha/Dynax/Maxxum series.

In 1972, Minolta drew up a formal cooperation agreement with Leitz. Leitz needed expertise in camera body electronics, and Minolta felt that they could learn from Leitz's optical expertise. Tangible results of this cooperation were the Leica CL/Minolta CL, an affordable rangefinder camera to supplement the Leica M range. The Leica CL was built by Minolta to Leica specifications. Other results were the Leica R3, which was in fact the Minolta XE-1 with a Leica lens mount, viewfinder, and spot metering system, and the Leica R4 was based on the Minolta XD-11. Additionally, five Minolta lenses were repackaged as Leica R lenses: the Minolta 24/2.8 MC Rokkor-X optics are found in the Leica 24/2.8 Elmarit-R, and similarly for the Minolta 35-70/3.5, 75-200/4.5, 70-210/4, and 16/2.8.

===== First "Program" focal plane shutter 35mm SLR: the XD-11 (XD, XD-7) =====
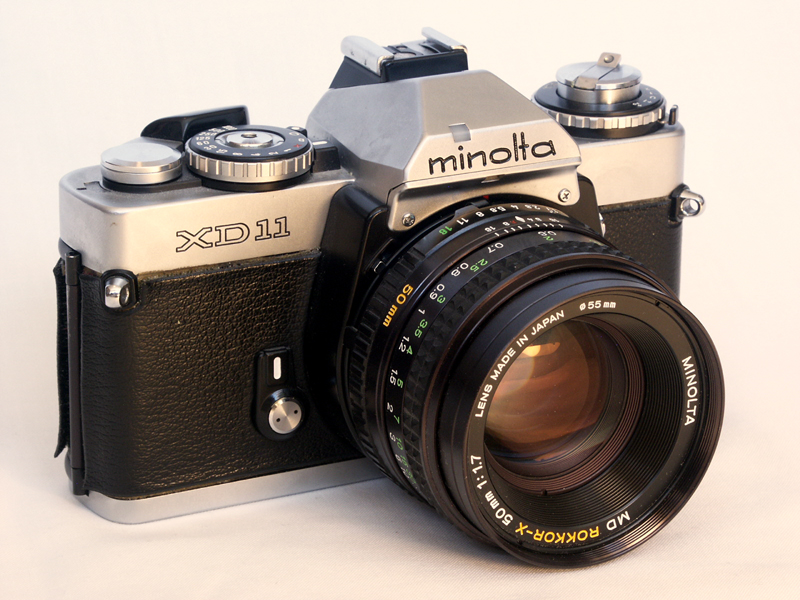
Minolta XD-11 (XD7/XD) (1977–1981)

In 1977, Minolta introduced the XD-11 (sold as XD in Japan and XD-7 in Europe), the first multimode 35mm SLR to include both aperture and shutter priority in a single body. It was also the first camera to employ a computerised chip, which in shutter priority mode overrode the chosen speed if necessary to give a correct exposure, thus offering the first-ever 'Programmed mode'. The XD-11 was the last attempt by Minolta to enter the professional and semiprofessional 35mm SLR market until the Maxxum 9 in 1998. Significant elements of the XD's design were implemented in Leica's R4 - R7 series of SLR's.

===== The Minolta Program System: The X-700 & X-Series =====
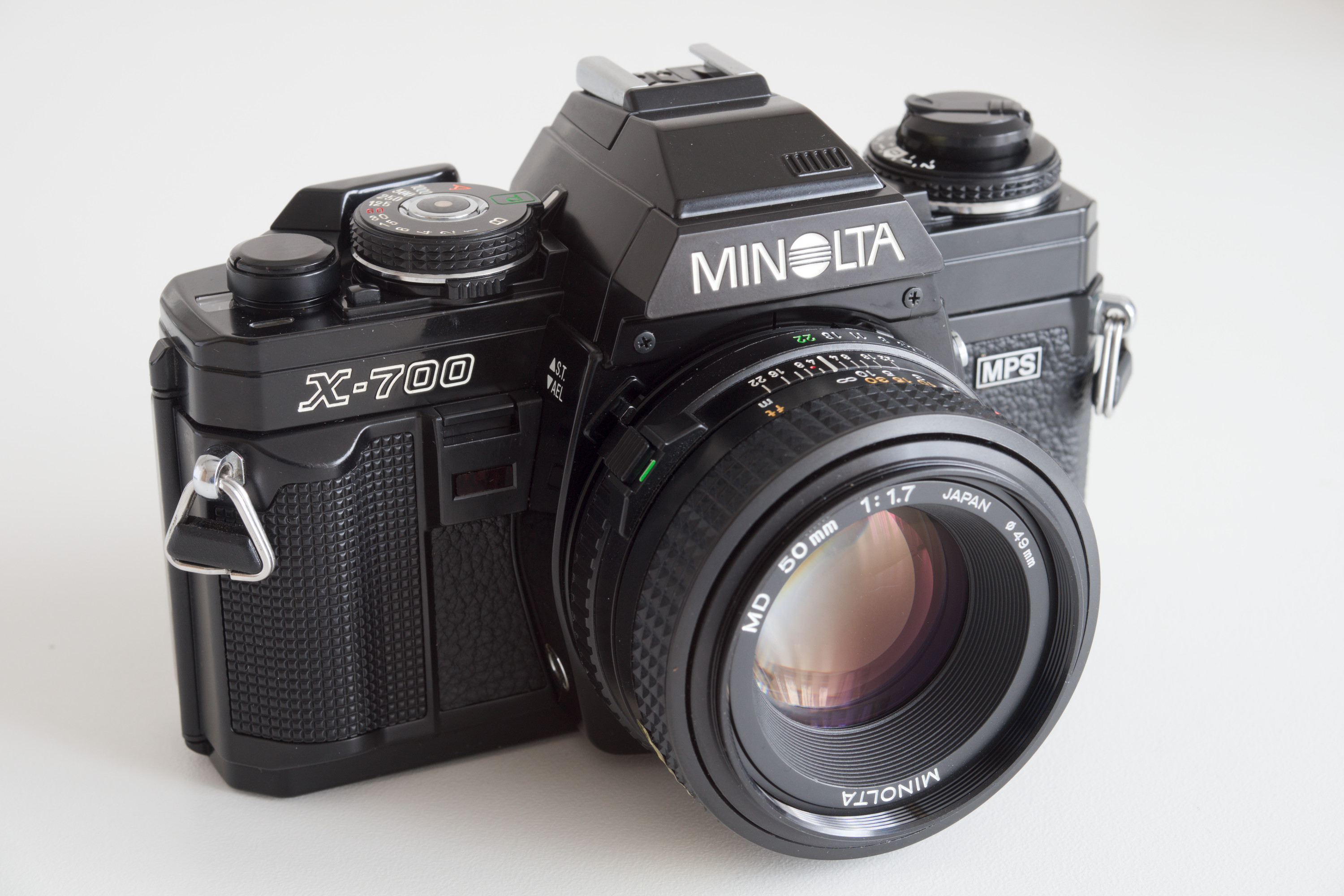
Minolta X-700 (1981, sporting the 'Rising Sun' Logo)

Minolta continued 35mm manual focus SLR cameras with the release of the X-700 in 1981, followed by the X-300, X-500 (known as X-370 and X-570 in the US) by 1983, but had begun to reposition its cameras to appeal to a broader market. Minolta decided to shift from the higher quality design and specifications of its earlier XD/XE Series to the cheaper cost-efficient designs of the XG and X-Hundred Series. These enthusiast models offered additional program and metering features designed to appeal to newer photographers, at a lower cost then their previous or competing counterparts. The vertical metal shutter design of the older cameras was rejected in favour of a horizontal cloth-curtain shutter, reducing flash sync speeds. Further cost savings were made, where some components were changed from metal to plastic, such as the external casing or internal low-tension gearing.

===== Autofocus SLRs =====
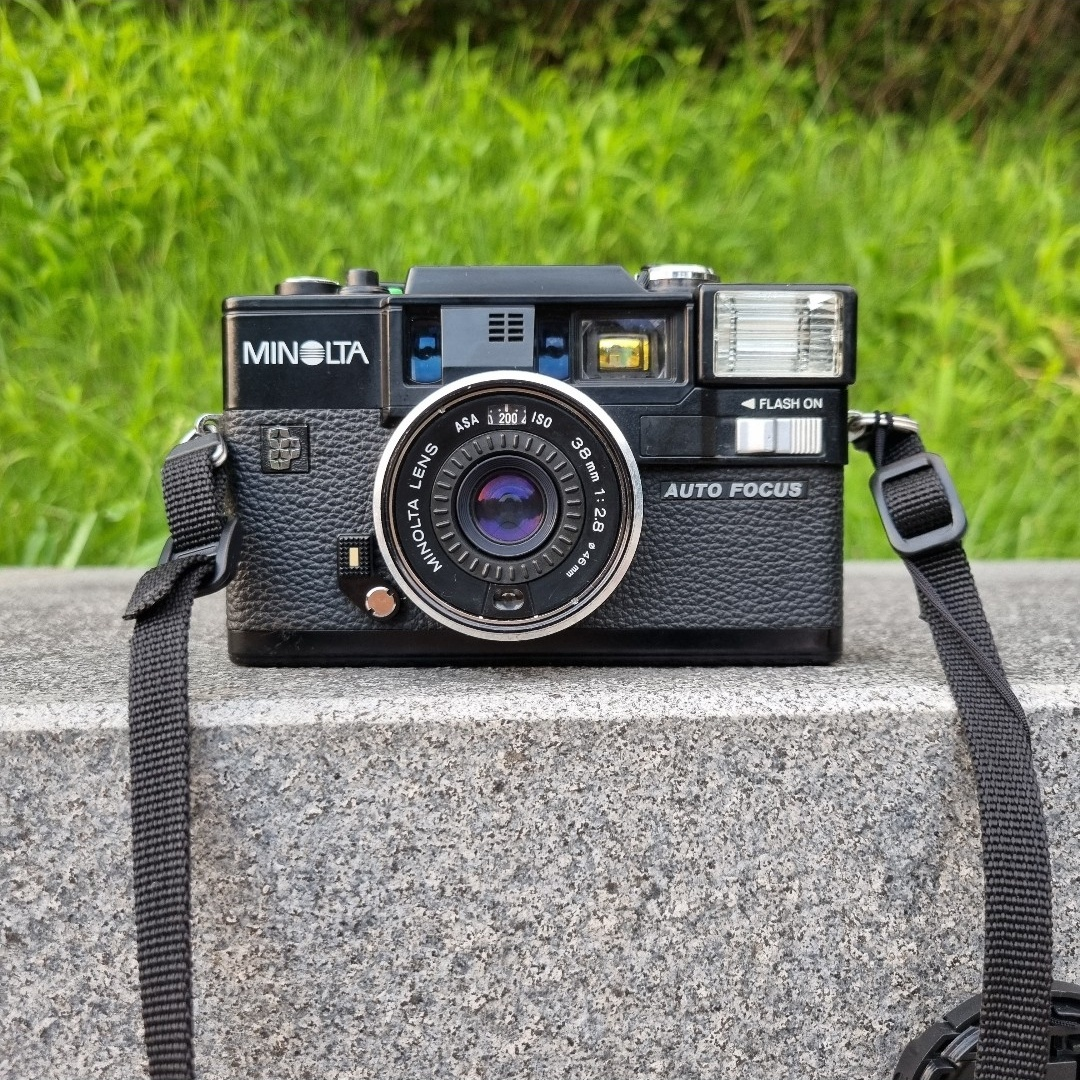
Minolta Hi-matic AF-d

Minolta obtained the research to develop autofocus technology from Leica during their partnership in the 1970s In 1985, Minolta introduced a new line of autofocus (AF) SLR cameras. In North America, they used the name Maxxum; in Europe, the cameras were called Dynax; and in Japan, they were named Alpha (α). They were the first commercially successful autofocus SLR's, which propelled Minolta camera sales at the time.

Unfortunately for Minolta, its autofocus design was found to infringe on the patents of Honeywell, a U.S. corporation. After protracted litigation, in 1991 Minolta was ordered to pay Honeywell damages, penalties, trial costs, and other expenses in a final amount of $127.6 million.

Minolta made one last attempt to enter the amateur and professional market with the Maxxum (Dynax) 9 in 1998, followed by the Maxxum 7 in 2000, which used a full LCD readout on the rear of the camera. Though well received by the photographic press, the 7 and 9 did not sell to expectations or achieve any significant breakthrough with their intended customer base, who had largely gravitated to the Canon or Nikon brands. All of these cameras were eventually discontinued in favor of the less-expensive Maxxum 50 and 70, which were sold under the Minolta name until 2006, when Konica Minolta ceased production of all film cameras.

Class	1985	1986	1987	1988	1989	1990	1991	1992	1993	1994	1995	1996	1997	1998	1999	2000	2001	2002	2003	2004	2005	2006
Higher flagship	9000 AF							9xi						9/9Ti								
Higher flagship																7						
Higher flagship																	7 Limited					
Lower flagship													800si									
Enthusiast	7000 AF				7000i																	
Enthusiast							8000i															
Enthusiast							7xi															
Enthusiast									700si													
Higher entry-Level		5000			5000i																	
Higher entry-Level								5xi														
Higher entry-Level										400si												
Higher entry-Level											500si			505si			5					
Higher entry-Level											600si classic			505si super								
Higher entry-Level																				70/60		
Lower entry-Level
Lower entry-Level					3000i																	
Lower entry-Level							3xi															
Lower entry-Level						2xi																
Lower entry-Level											300si				404si			4				
Lower entry-Level																			3			
Lower entry-Level																				50/40		

===== Digital SLRs =====
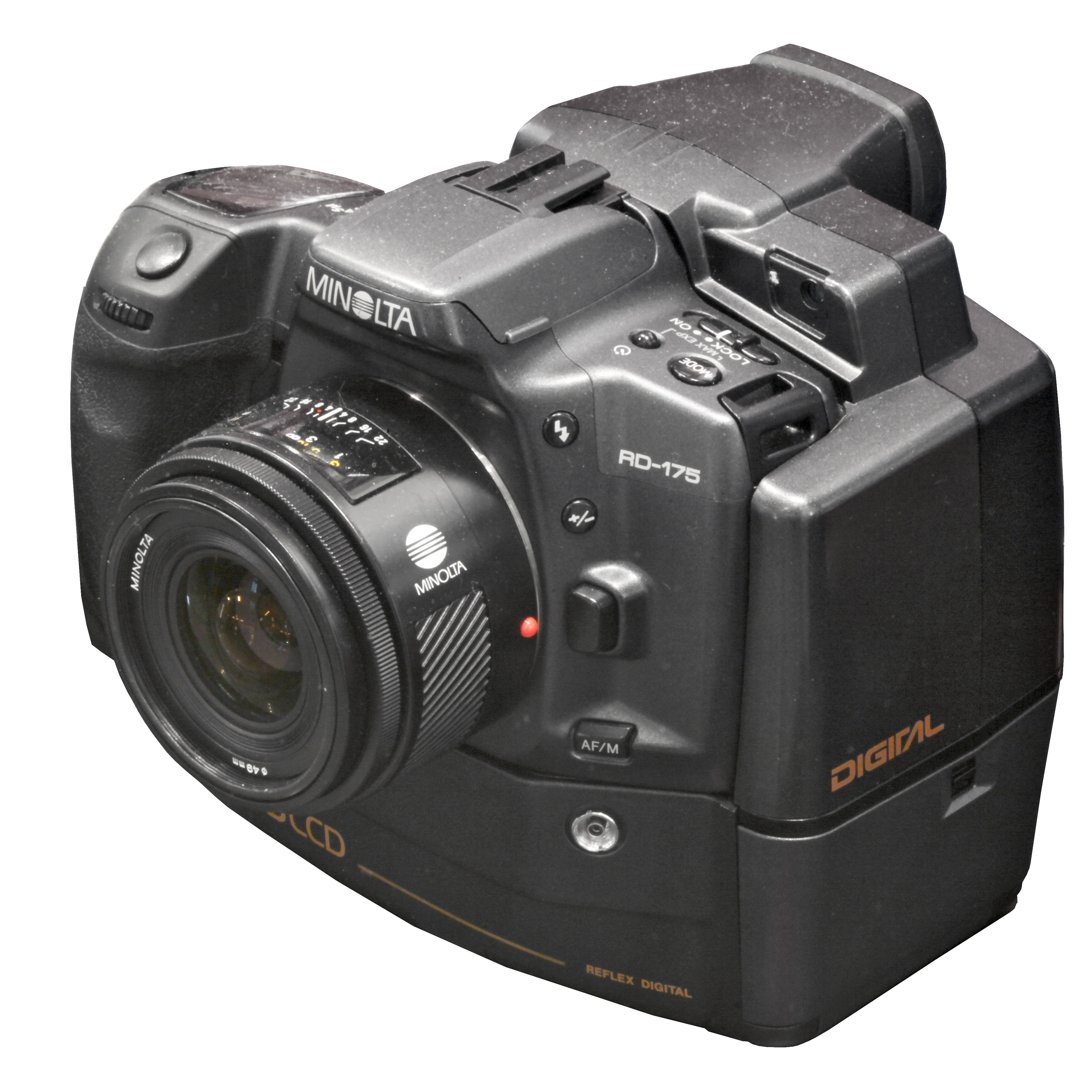
Minolta RD-175 using an optical reduction system for 3 x 1/2 inch CCD sensor with 3 x 0.38 megapixels

Although Minolta had launched their first digital SLR system as early as 1995, the RD-175—a 3 sensor (3 x 0.38 megapixel) camera based on the Maxxum 500si—was never successful, and in 1998, it was superseded by the Minolta Dimâge RD 3000, a 3-megapixel DSLR based on the Minolta V-mount of Minolta's APS format SLR camera line, which was equally unsuccessful and short-lived.

While Minolta was the inventor of the modern integrated AF SLR, it took Konica Minolta a long time to enter the digital SLR market, a delay that may have proved fatal. Konica Minolta was the last of the large camera manufacturers to launch a digital SLR camera (Maxxum/Dynax 5D and 7D) using the 35 mm AF mount. During July 2005, KM and Sony negotiated on a joint development of a new line of DSLR cameras, where it was believed that Konica Minolta and Sony would market their DSLR line to the masses (much like the joint marketing and development of Pentax and Samsung K10/GX10 DSLRs).

On 19 January 2006, KM announced that all DSLR production would continue under Sony's management; DSLR camera assets were transferred to Sony during the Konica Minolta withdrawal phase until March 31, 2006, where technical support for these cameras (primarily Konica Minolta's other digital cameras) was assumed by Sony, who announced the first Konica Minolta-based Sony SLR—the Alpha A100—on June 5, 2006. Sony continued the manufacture of DSLRs using Minolta technology until 2010 when the company phased out DSLRs for its SLT system but retained the Minolta A-mount.

==== Compact Film Cameras ====
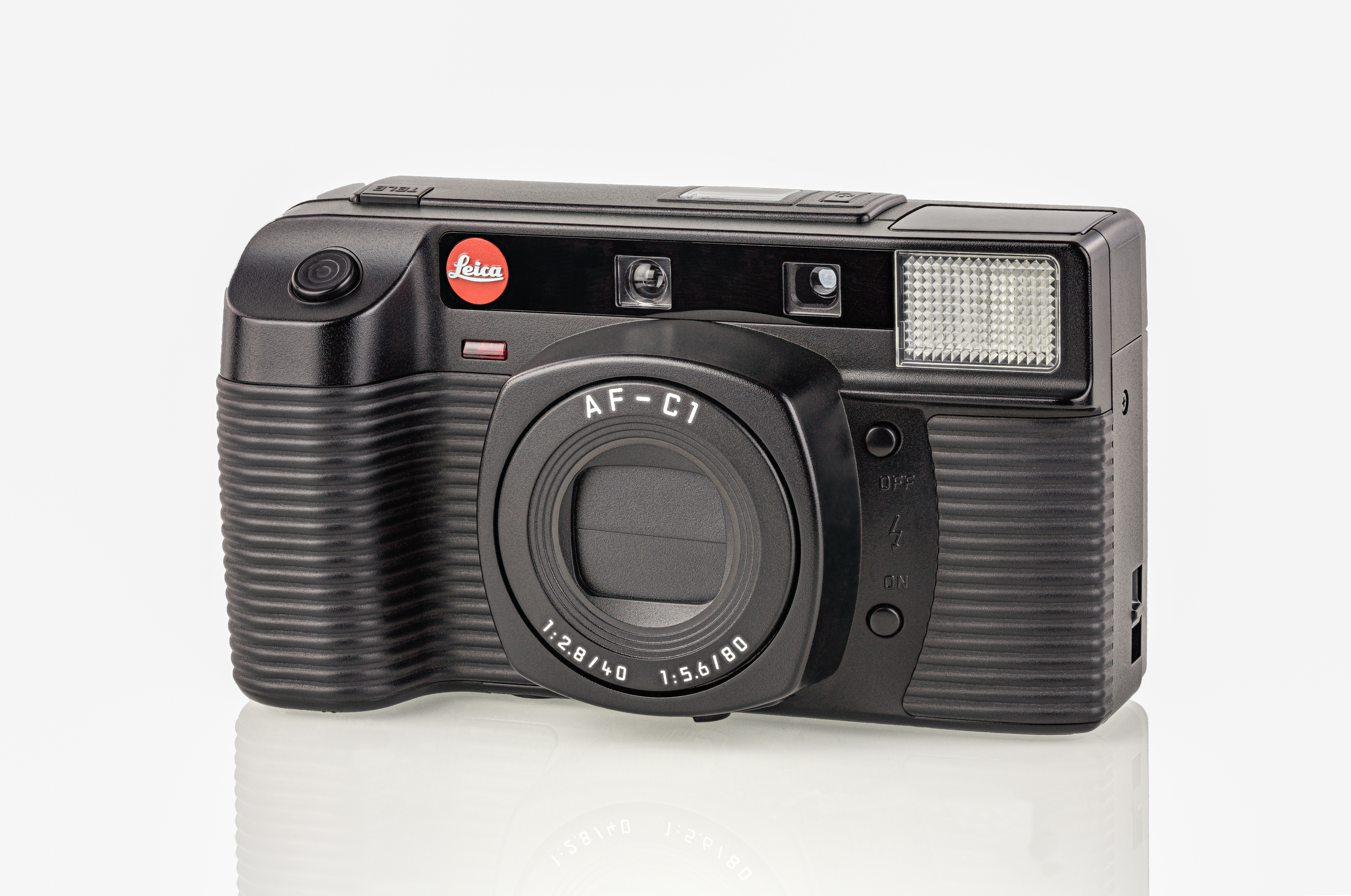
The first Leica compact camera, made by Minolta (1989–1991)

Minolta entered the highly competitive 35mm compact camera market in the 1980s and transitioned from older rangefinder designs to "point-and-shoot" (P&S) electronic autofocus/autowind cameras.

===== Digital cameras =====
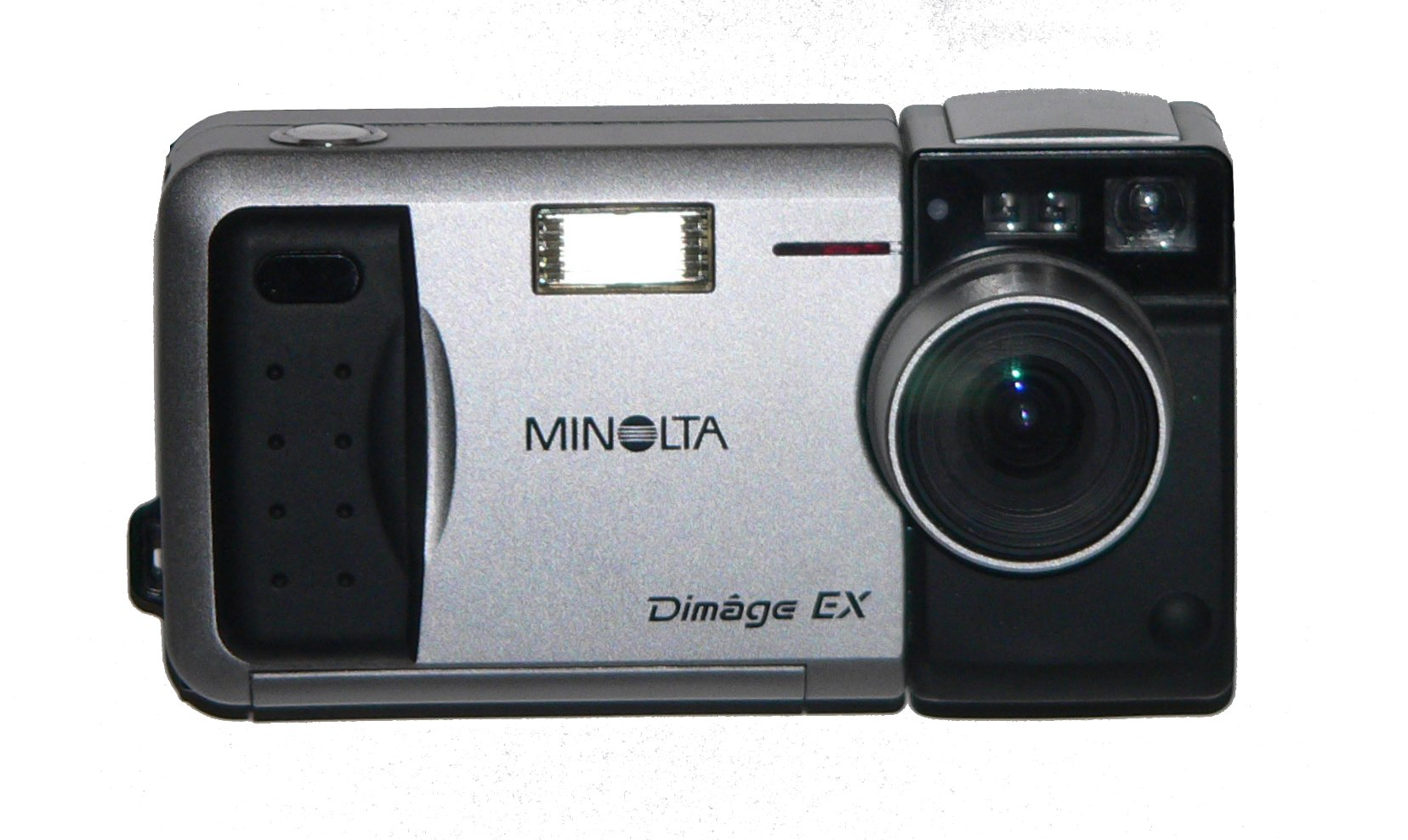
The Dimâge EX, an early digital camera

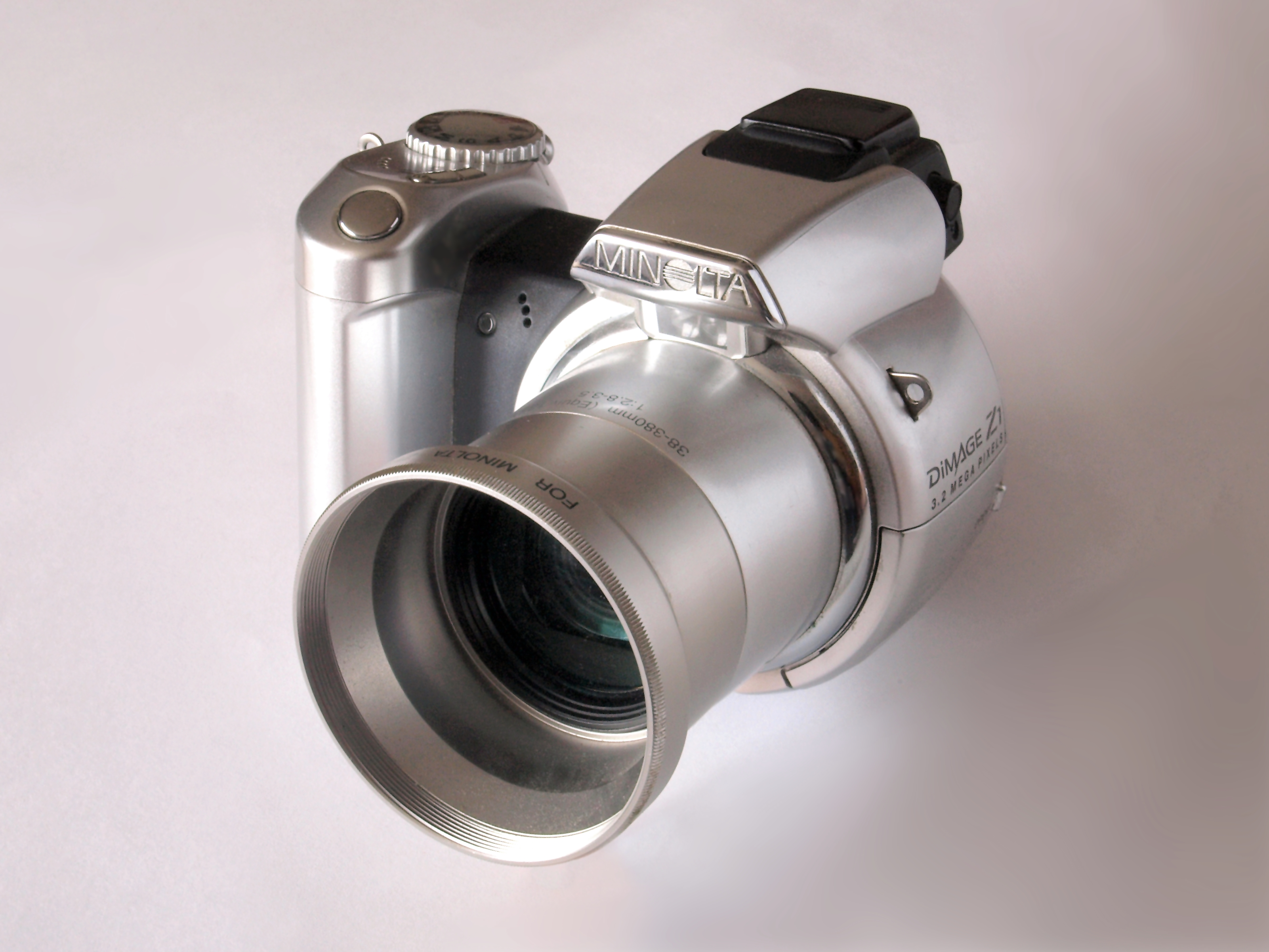
Minolta DiMAGE Z1

Minolta had a line of digital point-and-shoot cameras to compete in the digital photography market. Their DiMAGE line included digital cameras and imaging software as well as film scanners.

Minolta created a new category of "bridge cameras," with the introduction of the DiMAGE 7. Designed for use by people familiar with 35mm single-lens reflex (SLR) cameras but without the added cost or complication of interchangeable lenses or optical reflex viewfinders, the DiMAGE incorporated many of the features of a higher-level film camera with the simplicity of smaller compact digicams. The camera had a traditional zoom ring and focus ring on the lens barrel and was equipped with an electronic viewfinder (EVF) rather than the direct optical reflex view of an SLR. It added other features such as a histogram, and the cameras were compatible with Minolta's flashes for modern film SLRs.

However, the DiMAGE 7 (including the DiMAGE A1, A2, and A200) and similar bridge cameras were not really adequate substitutes for professional SLR cameras, and initially there were many reports of slow autofocus speed and various malfunctions (this surfaced when a Sony-designed CCD chip would malfunction, rendering the camera useless. Minolta, however, issued a CCD alert and fixed faulty units free of charge; after Konica Minolta's withdrawal from the photo business, Sony took over the CCD alert until the warranty repair service was terminated in 2010). Minolta later innovated in this line by being the first manufacturer to integrate a mechanical antishake system (Minolta's antishake is based inside the camera body as opposed to the camera lens, common with Canon EF and Nikon AF lenses).

In January 2002, Minolta again created a new category of camera, introducing the Minolta DiMAGE X, an ultracompact digital with a 3x folded zoom lens. With the folded approach, no moving parts of the lens are external to the camera. Instead, a 45-degree mirror bounces light to a conventional zoom lens safely tucked inside the camera body. Fast startup times are one potential benefit of this design (since nothing needs to extend), but slow focus and shutter lag times marred the advantage of this innovation.

According to a press release by Konica Minolta they "Konica Minolta Photo Imaging Inc. ceased its Camera Business Operations as of 31 March 2006, and ceased the entire customer services for Konica Minolta cameras and related products as of 31 December 2010"

=== APS format cameras ===
Minolta invested heavily into the Advanced Photo System) film-format cameras, most notably with the Vectis line of APS SLR cameras beginning in 1996. Digital photography was entering the marketplace however, and Minolta eventually discontinued all APS camera production due to poor sales.

=== Other developments ===
Minolta introduced features that became standard in all brands a few years later. Standardized features that were first introduced on Minolta models included multisensor light metering coupled to multiple AF sensors, automatic flash balance system, wireless TTL flash control, TTL-controlled full-time flash sync, and speedy front and rear wheels for shutter and aperture control. Special features introduced by Minolta are interactive LCD viewfinder display, setup memory, expansion program cards, eye-activated startup, and infrared frame .

== 2003 Konica Merger ==
The 2000 Minolta Dynax 7

In an effort to strengthen market share and acquire additional assets in cameras, printing, and optical equipment, Minolta merged with another long-time Japanese camera manufacturer, Konica Ltd., in 2003. The new corporation is called Konica Minolta

Until 2006 they made Alpha/Dynax/Maxxum digital and film-based cameras (retaining the different names in the different markets), improving the design while maintaining the basic concepts. The Maxxum 4 is a low-priced 35 mm SLR with an A-type bayonet mount, built-in flash, autoexposure, predictive autofocus, electronically controlled vertical-traverse focal plane shutter, and through-the-lens (TTL) phase-detection focusing and metering. In advertising literature, Minolta claimed that the Maxxum 4 was the most compact 35 mm AF SLR, and the second fastest at autofocusing, while the Maxxum 5 was the fastest at autofocusing. These cameras were, however, intended for the consumer end of the market.

== Timeline ==
- 1928: Kazuo Tashima establishes Nichi-Doku Shashinki Shōten ("Japanese-German photo company," the precursor of Minolta Co., Ltd.).
- 1929: Marketed the company's first camera, the "Nifcarette" (ニフカレッテ).
- 1937: The Minolta Flex is Japan's second twin-lens reflex camera (after the Prince Flex by Neumann & Heilemann).
- 1947: Introduction of the long lived 35mm rangefinder camera Minolta-35
- 1958: The Minolta SR-2 is Minolta's first single-lens reflex camera.
- 1959: The Minolta SR-1.
- 1962: John Glenn takes a specially modified Ansco-logoed Minolta Hi-Matic camera into space aboard Friendship 7. The company changes its name to Minolta Camera Co., Ltd.
- 1966: The Minolta SR-T 101 SLR camera is one of the first with TTL (through-the-lens) full aperture light metering. The first is Topcon RE Super from 1963.
- 1972: Minolta signs an agreement to cooperate with Leica in SLR development;
- 1973: The Minolta CL is the first fruit of this agreement.
- 1976: The Leica R3 is introduced. Minolta produces the R3, R4, and R5 models in the Leica R series. Subsequent cameras are built in Germany by Leica themselves.
- 1977: The Minolta XD-11 (N. America only, XD-7 worldwide) is introduced, the world's first 'multi mode' SLR offering M, A, S modes, with a 'Program override' in S mode effected by a computer chip, the world's first Program mode. This same year, Minolta also introduced the Minolta XG series starting with the Minolta XG-7.
- 1981: Implementation of Minolta's invention and patent of TTL (through-the-lens) OTF (off-the-film) exposure metering: the Minolta CLE is the first 35mm rangefinder camera to feature TTL metering and aperture priority autoexposure. The Minolta X-700 manual-focus SLR is introduced; this model is sold until 1999 and is enormously successful. The Minolta XD-11 (Model E) is the first Minolta product branded with an updated logo (in caps), which was in use until the 2003 merger with Konica.
- 1985: The Minolta Maxxum 7000 Alpha Mount Camera becomes the world's first autofocus 35mm SLR with in-camera autofocus motor.
- 1987: Honeywell files lawsuit against Minolta for patent infringement over autofocus technologies.
- 1991: Minolta's autofocus design was found to infringe on the patents of Honeywell. After protracted litigation, Minolta was ordered to pay Honeywell damages, penalties, trial costs, and other expenses in a final amount of $127.6 million.
- 1992: Minolta settles out of court with Honeywell.
- 1994: The company changes its name to Minolta Co., Ltd. because it no longer is primarily a camera company.
- 1995: Introduction of the Minolta RD-175, a 1.75-megapixel digital SLR camera.
- 1996: The Minolta Vectis camera is a completely new SLR system designed around the Advanced Photo System (APS) film format.
- 1998: The Minolta Maxxum 9 autofocus SLR is introduced. This system is targeted toward the professional photographer and has many features not duplicated by the competition.
- 2003: DiMAGE A1 introduced world's first sensor-based anti-shake, and was the final Minolta product branded prior to the Konica Minolta merger.
- 2004: Minolta and Konica officially merge to become Konica Minolta Holdings, Inc.
- 2005: The company announces joint venture with Sony on CCD and CMOS technologies.
- 2006: Konica Minolta announces it is discontinuing all film and digital camera production, ending a 78-year history as a camera manufacturer. Final models released were DiMAGE X1 and Z6. Konica Minolta Photo Image, Inc.'s (the camera business portion of Konica Minolta) assets regarding digital camera technology are transferred to Sony for continued development started from the joint venture.

== See also ==
- Rokkor
- Quality Micro Systems
- Konica Minolta
- Laboratory equipment
- List of Minolta products
- Sony α Sony Alpha DSLR

== Bibliography ==
- Photoxels.com. Brief History of Minolta. Retrieved on 2005-11-29 from https://web.archive.org/web/20060206183204/http://www.photoxels.com/history_minolta.html.
- Sony Corporation announced a new brand for digital Single Lens Reflex (SLR) cameras which Konica Minolta Photo Imaging, Inc. has developed.
