= Minolta Vectis S series =

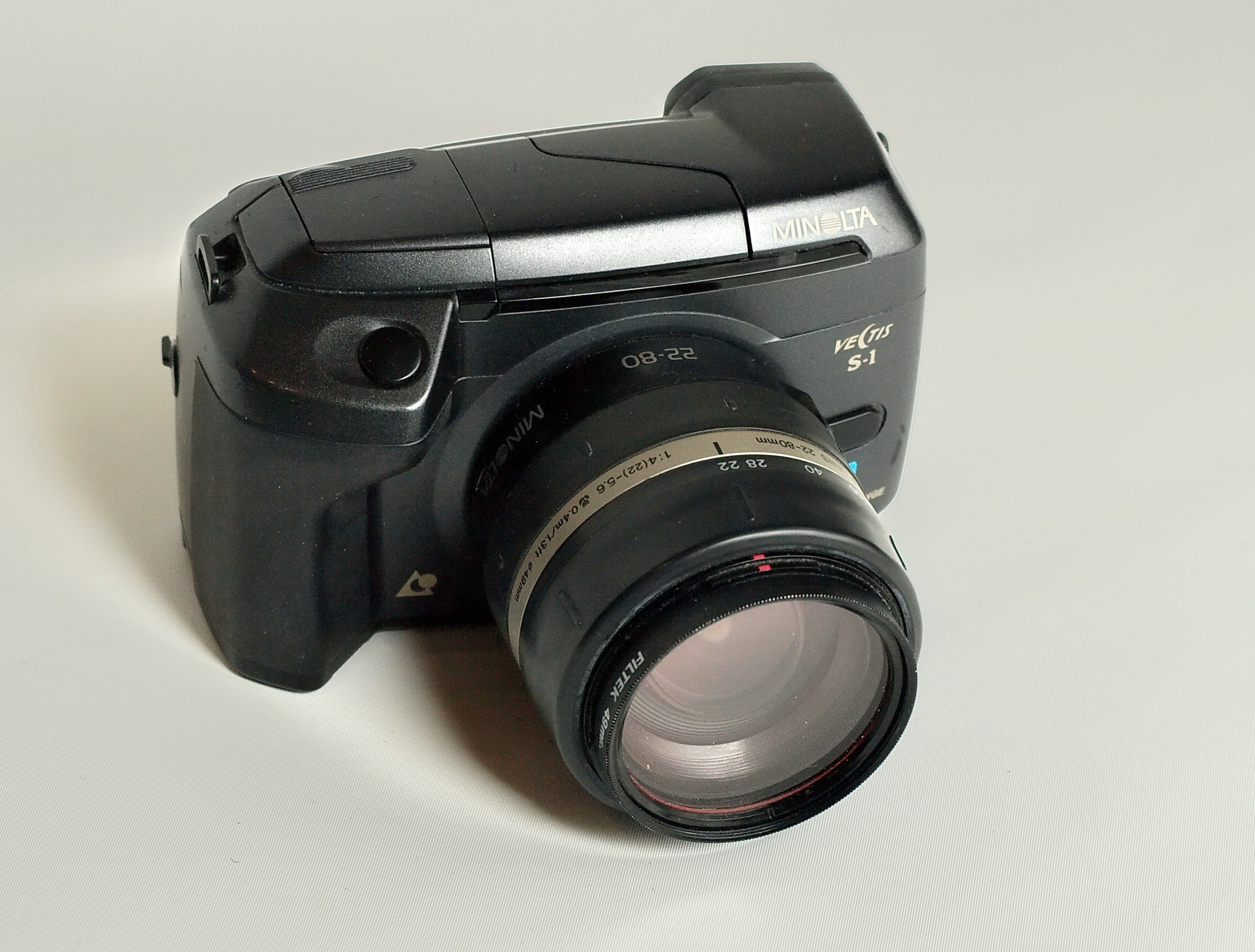
Minolta Vectis S-1.

The Minolta Vectis S-series comprises two APS system models of film SLR cameras made by Minolta, the flagship model Vectis S-1 and the Vectis S-100. The cameras feature a compact design, owing to the use of mirrors instead of prisms in the viewfinder.

Only one early DSLR camera body, the Minolta Dimâge RD 3000, also used the V-lens mount.

== Cameras ==
The Vectis brand was also shared with a number of small APS point and shoot cameras with fixed lenses, including the waterproof Vectis Weathermatic and Vectis GX series. The model numbers of these cameras don't include the S prefix used for the SLR series.

=== Vectis S-1 ===
The S-1 was designed to be splashproof by using a porro mirror optical viewfinder, rather than the typical SLR pentaprism. It is equipped with three basic autoexposure modes (Program, Aperture-priority, Shutter-priority) and Manual exposure modes; there are five subject-specific program modes that can be selected (Portrait, Landscape, Close-up, Sports, and Night Portrait). The standard metering pattern is a 14-segment "honeycomb" pattern covering the central part of the frame, but the camera can be switched to spot metering mode, with the area being metered indicated by the central circle on the focusing screen. For through-the-lens flash exposure control, the camera switches to a four-segment metering pattern.

The S-1 supports mid-roll changes. There is a single central autofocus sensor which may be overridden using the manual focus ring on the lens without moving out of autofocus mode.

=== Vectis S-100 ===
Like the S-1, the S-100 is weather resistant to light rain and snowy conditions. Compared to the S-1, the S-100 is equipped with a simpler exposure meter (two-segment, no spot metering option) and shutter (fastest speed reduced to 1/1000 s and flash synchronization speed slowed to 1/90 s). In addition, the optical viewfinder has slightly less coverage of the final frame area. It offers the same exposure modes (PASM) and subject-specific program exposure modes, and also uses a central autofocus sensor.

=== Dimâge RD 3000 ===
The Minolta Dimâge RD 3000 is a digital single lens reflex camera which succeeds the earlier Minolta RD-175. The RD 3000 shares features and accessories with the Vectis S-1, including V mount lenses and shutter speeds. It is equipped with two 1/2" progressive-scan CCD image sensors, each with a native resolution of 1.5 megapixels; output is combined to render a finished image resolution of 1984×1360 pixels, approximately 2.7 MP. The image formed at the film plane is conveyed via relay optics and a beam-splitter to the CCD image sensors; it takes the APS "C"lassic central portion of the image in a 3:2 ratio, making the native crop factor 1.5× compared to 24×36 mm "full-frame" cameras; this crop factor is slightly greater than the APS native "H" frame dimension.

== Vectis V mount ==
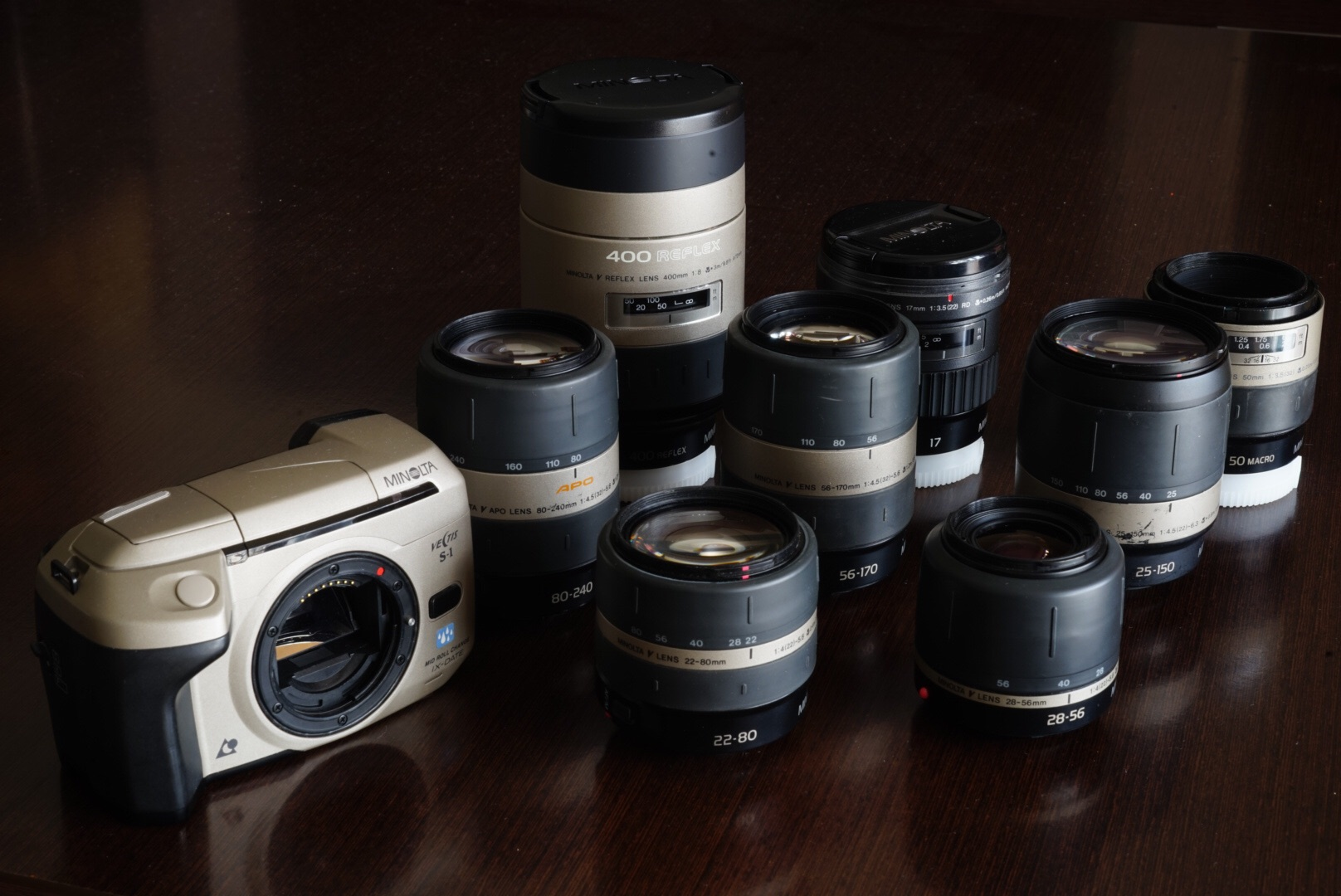
S-1 with complete line of eight Vectis V mount lenses

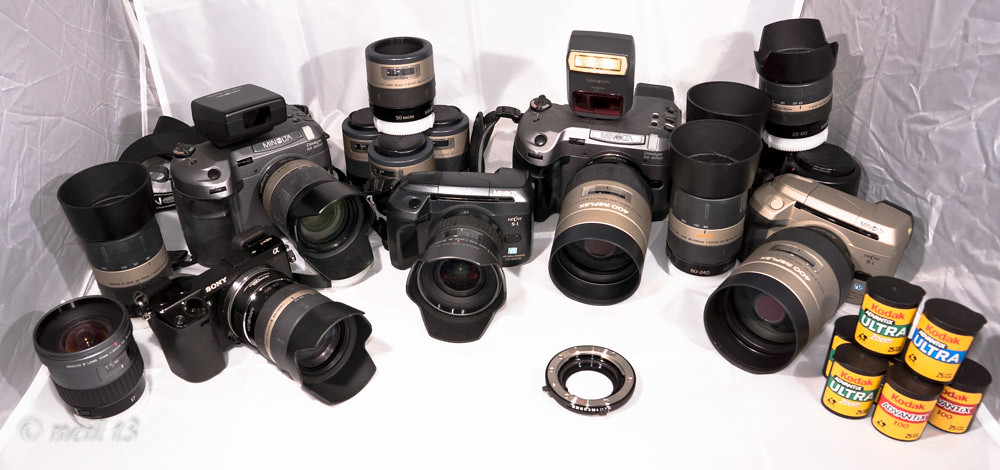
Minolta Vectis S series Lineup

The Vectis V mount lenses used by the above models are not compatible with any other lens mount, including Minolta's 35mm A-mount and SR-mount systems. Aperture and focus are controlled electronically by the camera; the image circle of the lenses only illuminates the APS formats, and the flange focal distance of V mount is only 36.00 mm.

The short film-to-flange distance, limited image circle, and proprietary electronic signaling limit options to adapt V mount lenses to other cameras. A limited hand-produced run of the Chinese-made "MonsterAdapter LA-VE1" was released in 2015 which allows the use of V mount lenses on Sony E mount cameras, offering aperture control, focal length detection for both Exif and IBIS, and manual-only focus. A new version, the "MonsterAdapter LA-VE2", appeared as a crowd funded item on Indiegogo and offers the same features of the LA-VE1 plus the added benefit of auto-focus. This new adaptor was offered starting from September 2022. It is fully compatible with newer E mount Sony cameras and offers limited compatibility with older E mount cameras.

=== List of V mount lenses ===
List of V mount interchangeable lenses
FL (mm)	Aperture	Name	Catalog	Construction		Min. Focus	Dimensions			Notes
FL (mm)	Aperture	Name	Catalog	Ele	Grp	Min. Focus	Φ×L	Wgt.	Filter	Notes
Wide angle lenses
17	f/3.5–22	V Lens RD	#2764	?	?	?	?	?	?	Listed as suitable for RD-3000 only
Wide to telephoto zoom lenses
22–80	f/4–5.6–22–32	Vectis	#2301	12	10	0.4 m (1 ft 4 in)	62×57.5 mm (2.4×2.3 in)	6.8 oz (190 g)	49	
25–150	f/4.5–6.3–22	Vectis	#2309	?	?	0.8 m (2 ft 7 in)	66×76.5 mm (2.6×3.0 in)	11 oz (310 g)	55	
28–56	f/4–5.6–22–32	Vectis	#2303	7	7	0.35 m (1 ft 2 in)	59×52 mm (2.3×2.0 in)	3.9 oz (110 g)	40.5	
Macro lenses
50	f/3.5–32	Vectis Macro	#2305	5	5	0.23 m (9.1 in)	62×63.5 mm (2.4×2.5 in)	4.9 oz (140 g)	46	
Telephoto zoom lenses
56–170	f/4.5–5.6–32–38	Vectis	#2304	9	9	1.2 m (3 ft 11 in)	62×81.5 mm (2.4×3.2 in)	8.5 oz (240 g)	46	
80–240	f/4.5–5.6–32–38	Vectis APO	#2302	11	9	1.2 m (3 ft 11 in)	62×81.5 mm (2.4×3.2 in)	9.3 oz (260 g)	46	
Telephoto lenses
400	f/8	Vectis RF	#2307	7	5	1.2 m (3 ft 11 in)	75×102 mm (3.0×4.0 in)	16.6 oz (470 g)	72	

The 17 mm lens is specified to work with the RD 3000 only, but can be used on the S-1 and S-100 as well. The 400 mm reflex lens as well as the 25–150 mm and 56–170 mm zooms may not perform to their full potential on the RD 3000, however.

At least the 400 mm lens illuminates the full frame format, albeit with soft vignette typical for refractive designs.
