= Yōko Nogiwa =

Japanese actress (1936–2017)

Yoko Nogiwa
- 野際 陽子
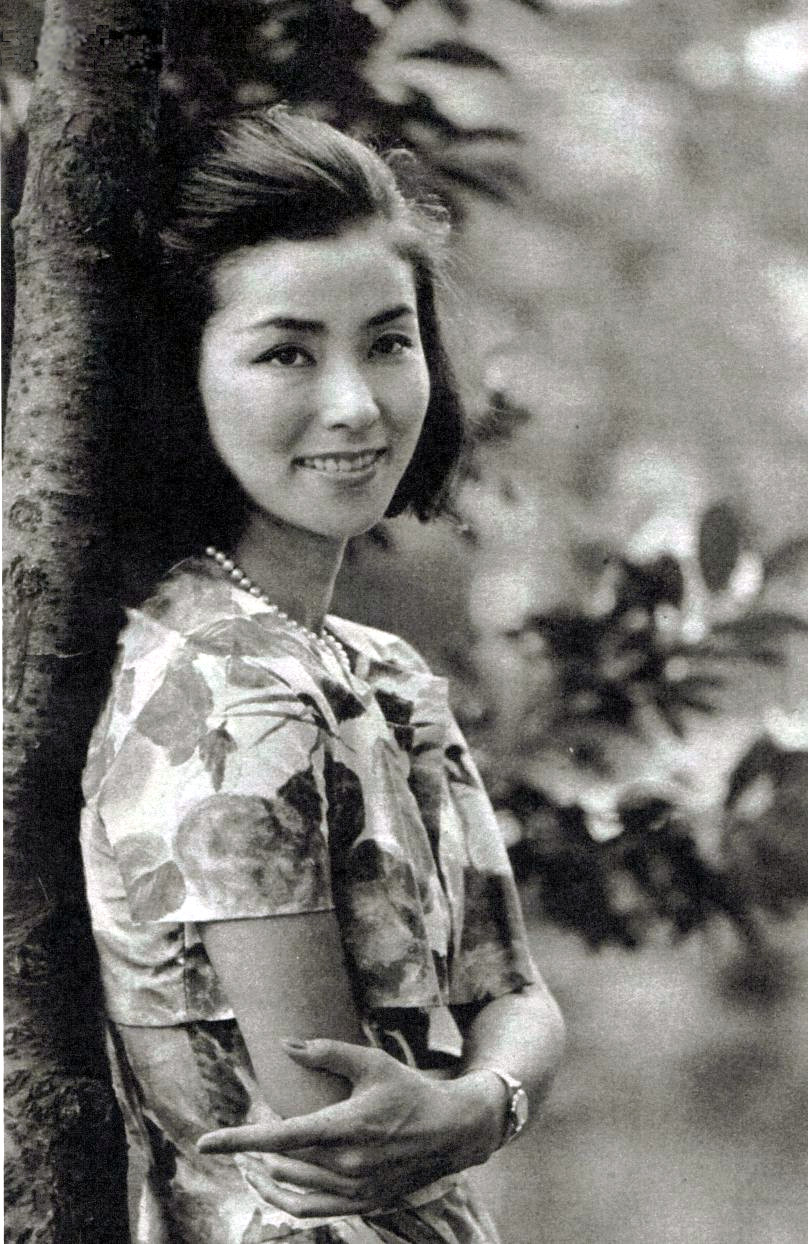
- Yoko in 1963
- Born: 24 January 1936; Tsubata, Ishikawa, Japan
- Died: 13 June 2017 (aged 81); Tokyo, Japan
- Occupations: Actress; television presenter; narrator
- Years active: 1958–2017
- Spouse: Sonny Chiba (m. 1973; div. 1994)
- Children: Juri Manase

Yōko Nogiwa (野際 陽子, Nogiwa Yōko; 24 January 1936 – 13 June 2017) was a Japanese actress. Her acting career spanned from 1958 until 2017.

== Biography ==
Nogiwa was born in Toyama, Toyama, and grew up in Suginami, Tokyo from the age of three. She graduated from Rikkyo University.

In 1973, she married Sonny Chiba, with whom she co-starred in the TV series Key Hunter. They had a daughter, Juri Manase, in 1975, who later became an actress. Nogiwa and Chiba divorced in 1994.

Nogiwa died from lung cancer on 13 June 2017, at the age of 81.

== Filmography ==
=== Films ===
- Yakuza Deka (1970) – A singer
- Nichiren (1979)
- The Battle of Port Arthur (1980) – Shizuko Nogi
- Shaso (1989)
- Minna no Ie (2001) – Setsuko Iijima
- When Will You Return? (2017) – Tomoko Ashimura (present days)

=== Television ===
- Key Hunter (1967) - Keiko Tsugawa
- Onihei Hankachō (1975) -Omasa
- The Super Girl (1979) - Yuko Hirose
- Hideyoshi (1996) – Omaki no kata
- Trick (2000) – Satomi Yamada
- Honmamon (2001–2002)
- At Home Dad (2004) – Yoshie Koshikawa
- Shinsengumi! (2004) – Kondō Fude
- Yasuragi no Sato (2017) – Ryoko Ibuka

=== Dubbing ===
- Alien (1980 Fuji TV edition) – Ripley (Sigourney Weaver)
