= Minolta Dimage 5 =

Camera manufactured by Minolta

Minolta DiMage 5
Overview
- Maker: Minolta
- Type: Bridge camera

Lens
- Lens: 32 - 250 mm

Sensor/medium
- Sensor type: CCD
- Sensor size: 2048 x 1536
- Recording medium: CompactFlash

General
- Battery: AA batteries

The Minolta DiMAGE 5 is a "pro-sumer" digital bridge camera, utilising both an electronic viewfinder and LCD back. It is capable of capturing images at 3.3 megapixel range.

The DiMAGE 5 was announced 11 February 2001. The Dimage 5 is the middle-range model, with the same sophisticated controls as Dimage 7, but a smaller 3.34-megapixel CCD and an expanded 35-250mm equivalent lens (due to the smaller CCD). The camera uses a 2048 x 1536 pixel sensor and has a fixed 7x optical zoom lens. In designing the Dimage 5 and 7 Minolta have aimed to create SLR-type handling characteristics. The electronic viewfinder, manual zoom, and manual focus ring make the whole user experience more akin to an SLR. Minolta DiMAGE 5 it uses manual zoom (grey rubber with numbers), this saves battery power, and it gives added control. The focussing ring, being at the base of the lens, makes manual focussing function easy to control. Conveniently placed on the lens is the macro switch, which can only be used when the lens is fully extended.
