= Minolta Dimage 7 series =

Digital camera model

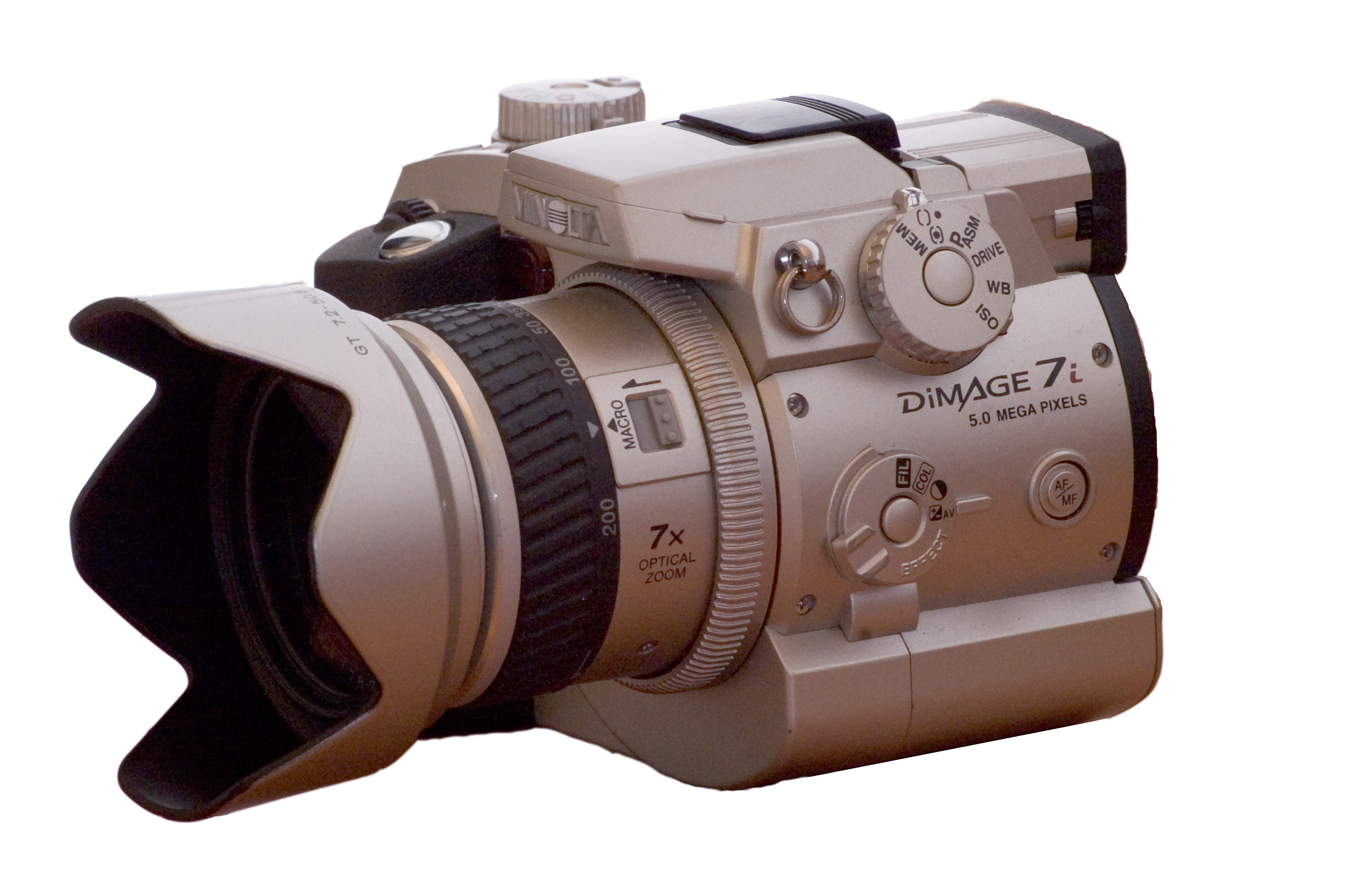
Minolta Dimage 7i

The Minolta Dimage 7, 7i, 7Hi series is a prosumer line of digital electronic viewfinder cameras from Minolta. These are also known as bridge digital cameras. They are capable of capturing images in the 5-megapixel range.

The Dimage 7 was announced 11 February 2001. The line uses a 2588 × 1960 pixel sensor coupled with a permanently attached optical 28–200 mm (35 mm equivalent) f/2.8W – f/3.5T zoom lens with a macro switch (16 elements in 13 groups, includes two AD glass elements and two aspheric elements)

The Dimage 7/7i/7Hi series cameras were powered with four AA batteries, which discharged quickly; the 7-series was replaced by the DiMAGE A1 in July 2003.

== Specifications ==
7Hi/7i
CCD	ICX282AQF; 2/3-type interline interlaced primary-color Super HAD CCD; Total pixels: approx. 5.24 million Number of effective pixels: approx. 5.07 million Number of active pixels: approx. 5.02 million Chip size: 9.74 mm (H) × 7.96 mm (V); Unit cell size: 3.4 μm (H) × 3.4 μm (V); Saturation signal: 450 mV; Sensitivity: 270 mV (G signal, 3200 K, 706 cd/m2, F5.6, 1/30 s accumulation); Dark signal: 16 mV (Ta=60 °C, 3.75 frame/s); Smear: −92 dB (without a mechanical shutter, frame readout mode)
Image processing	CxProcess
Operating system	pSOSystem/MIPS 2.5.x
Camera sensitivity	JPEG, TIFF, Motion JPEG (MOV): Auto (100–400), ISO 100, 200, 400, 800 equivalents RAW: ISO 100 equivalent
Aspect ratio	4:3
Lens construction	16 elements in 13 groups (includes two AD glass elements and two aspheric elements)
Maximum aperture	f/2.8 – f/3.5
Aperture steps	f/2.8, 3.5, 4, 4.5, 5.6, 6.7, 8, 9.5
Focal length	7.2 – 50.8 mm (35 mm equivalent: 28 – 200 mm); Macro: 7.2 and 43 – 50.8 mm (35 mm equivalent: 28 and 170 – 200 mm)
Focusing range (from CCD)	0.5 m / 19.7 inch to infinity Macro: Wide 30 – 60 cm / 11.8 – 23.6 inch, Telephoto 25 – 60 cm / 9.8 – 23.6 inch
Maximum magnification	0.177× (equivalent to 0.7× in 35 mm format) (With a focal length of 50.8 mm. Distance at 25 cm); Area covered at maximum magnification: 50 × 37 mm / 2 × 1.5 inch (approx.)
Optical zooming control	Manual zooming ring
Optical focus control	Precision Focus-by-wire rotating focusing ring
Autofocus system	Video AF
Focus lock	By pressing shutter-release button partway down. Also possible with spot-AE lock button (The function of the spot-AE lock button can be changed with the recording menu)
Autofocus areas	Wide focus area, Spot focus point: Flex Focus Point control with spot focus point mode
Focus modes	Autofocus: Single-shot AF (DMF), Continuous AF (DMF); Manual focus: DMF - Direct Manual Focus
Focus features	Pixel binning in low light conditions Center scan mode for 4× electronic zoom image (EVF/LCD, manual focus); 2× digital zoom (LCD, manual focus)
Exposure modes	P (Programmed AE) (with program shift), A (Aperture priority), S (shutter priority), M (manual).
AE lock	With Spot-AE lock button or by pressing the shutter-release button partway down
Metering	Multi-segment (300 segments), center-weighted, Spot
Exposure control range	P / A modes: Wide; Ev – 1 – 18, Telephoto; Ev – 0.4 (7Hi) / 1.6 (7i) – 18.7; S / M modes: Wide; Ev – 1 – 17, Telephoto; Ev – 0.4 (7Hi) / 1.6 (7i) – 17.7
shutter	CCD electronic shutter and mechanical shutter
shutter speed range	7Hi: 15 - 1/4000 seconds (in P / A modes, ISO 100), Bulb (max. 30 seconds); 7i: 4 – 1/4000 seconds (in P / A modes), 4 – 1/2000 seconds (in S / M modes), Bulb (max. 30 seconds)
White-balance control	7Hi: Automatic, Preset {Daylight, Tungsten, Fluorescent 1, 2 (white / cool white), Cloudy}, Custom (3 positions); 7i: Automatic, Preset (Daylight, Tungsten, Fluorescent, Cloudy), Custom
Digital Subject Programs	Portrait, Sports action, Sunset, Night portrait, Text
Digital Effects Control	Exposure, Color saturation, Contrast compensation, Filter
Exposure compensation	+/− 2 Ev in 1/3 increments
Flash metering	ADI, Pre-flash TTL, Manual flash control: ADI - Advanced Distance Integration
Flash-sync speeds	All shutter speeds
Flash modes	Fill-flash, Red-eye reduction, Rear flash sync, Wireless / Remote flash
Built-in flash range* (approx.)	ISO setting / Flash range (wide angle) / Flash range (telephoto); AUTO / 0.5 m – 3.8 m / 1.6 ft – 12.5 ft / 0.5 m – 3.0 m / 1.6 ft – 9.8 ft; 100 / 0.5 m – 2.7 m / 1.6 ft – 8.8 ft / 0.5 m – 2.1 m / 1.6 ft – 6.9 ft; 200 / 0.5 m – 3.8 m / 1.6 ft – 12.5 ft / 0.5 m – 3.0 m / 1.6 ft – 9.8 ft; 400 / 0.5 m – 5.4 m / 1.6 ft – 17.6 ft / 0.5 m – 4.2 m / 1.6 ft – 13.8 ft; 800 / 0.5 m – 7.6 m / 1.6 ft – 25 ft / 0.5 m – 6.0 m / 1.6 ft – 19.6 ft; When the camera sensitivity is set to auto, the ISO is set between ISO 100 and 200.; The flash range is measured from CCD.
External flash connection	Accessory shoe Flash sync terminal (7Hi)
Recycling time	7 seconds (approx.)
Flash compensation	+/−2 Ev in 1/3 increments
Viewfinder type	EVF (Electronic viewfinder), Variable-position: 0–90 degrees Automatic monitor amplification, electronic magnification for manual focusing
Viewfinder display	4.8 mm (0.19 inch) Ferroelectric reflective liquid crystal microdisplay Equivalent visual resolution: 220,000 pixels (approx.), field of view: 100% (approx.); Display format: 300 (H) × 224 (V); Pixel dimensions: 0.0135 mm (pixel dimensions include a 0.0005 mm interpixel gap); Color depth: 18 bits (6-bit RGB); Brightness: 250 cd/m2 Contrast ratio: 80:1
Viewfinder magnification	0.31 – 2.1×
Diopter control	−5 to +0.5 diopter
Eye relief	20 mm (from eyepiece)
LCD monitor	46 mm (1.8 inch) low-temperature polysilicon TFT color Total pixels: 118,000, field of view: 100% (approx.); Number of colors: Analog full color Pixel arrangement: RGB delta Effective pixels per unit area: 115.4 dots/mm² Optical transmittance: 8.6% Contrast ratio: 200:1
Display format	Recording mode: Live image, Grid, Scale, Quick view, Instant playback, Histogram of live image, Various statuses Playback mode: Single-frame, Index, Enlarged playback, Slide show, Histogram of recorded image, Various statuses
Display-mode switch	Auto-display (Viewfinder proximity sensor), Electronic viewfinder display, LCD-monitor display
A/D conversion	12 bits Correlated Double Sampling (CDS); 79 dB SNR
Camera memory	7Hi: 64 MB (SDRAM); 7i: 32 MB (SDRAM)
File formats	JPEG, TIFF, Motion JPEG (MOV), RAW. DCF 1.0 / DPOF 1.1-compliant
Printing output control	7Hi: Exif Print, PRINT Image Matching II; 7i: Exif Print, PRINT Image Matching
Recording media	Type I and Type II CompactFlash cards (max. 2 GB) IBM Microdrive (170 MB, 340 MB, 512 MB, 1 GB)
Image quality modes	RAW, Super fine (TIFF), Extra-Fine (7Hi), Fine, Standard, Economy (7i)
Number of recorded pixels	Still images (JPG): 2560 × 1920, 1600 × 1200, 1280 × 960, 640 × 480; Still images (RAW): 2568 × 1928; Movie clips: 640 × 480 (UHS continuous-advance mode), 320 × 240 (standard, night movie modes), Time-lapse movie at all image sizes
Color modes	Natural Color (sRGB), Vivid Color (sRGB), Adobe RGB (7Hi), Black and white (neutral and toned), Solarization
Advanced color management	Yes (7hi): Embedded ICC Profiles are available for all formats except RAW
Sharpness settings	Three levels (Soft, Normal, Hard)
File size* (approx.)	/ 2560 × 1920 / 1600 × 1200 / 1280 × 960 / 640 × 480; Economy / n/a (7Hi) / 670KB (7i) / n/a (7Hi) / 390KB (7i) / n/a (7Hi) / 300KB (7i) / n/a (7Hi) / 160KB (7i); Standard / 1.5 MB (7Hi) / 1.1 MB (7i) / 660 KB (7Hi) / 620 KB (7i) / 460 KB (7Hi) / 420 KB (7i) / 240 KB (7Hi) / 200 KB (7i); Fine / 2.5 MB (7Hi) / 2.1 MB (7i) / 1.0 MB (7Hi) / 1.0 MB (7i) / 720 KB (7Hi) / 680 KB (7i) / 320 KB (7Hi) / 280 KB (7i); Extra Fine / 4.8 MB (7Hi) / n/a (7i) / 1.9 MB (7Hi) / n/a (7i) / 1.3 MB (7Hi) / n/a (7i) / 420 KB (7Hi) / n/a (7i); Super Fine / 14.2 MB (7Hi) / 14.1 MB (7i) / 5.6 MB (7Hi) / 5.6 MB (7i) / 3.6 MB (7Hi) / 3.6 MB (7i) / 1.0 MB (7Hi) / 980 KB (7i); RAW / 9.6 MB (7Hi) / 9.5 MB(7i) / n/a / n/a / n/a; Movie / 297 KByte/second (7Hi) / 250 KByte/second (7i); Numerical value may vary depending upon the subject.
Continuous advance	Modes : High Speed continuous advance (with 2560 × 1920 size images) (7Hi); UHS (Ultra High Speed) continuous advance (with 1280 × 960 size images); Standard continuous advance: UHS and standard continuous advance cannot be used with Super Fine or RAW images.; Speeds : High Speed continuous advance: max. 3 frame/s (approx.) (7Hi); UHS (Ultra High Speed) continuous advance: 7 frame/s (approx.); Standard continuous advance: max. 2 frame/s: Actual speeds may vary depending upon subjects and shooting conditions.
Interval recording	2 – 99 frames. Interval time: 1 – 10 / 15 / 20 / 30 / 45 / 60 minutes
Digital Enhanced Bracketing	Exposure, Contrast, Color saturation, Filter; Exposure: 1.0, 0.5, 0.3 Ev increments Contrast, Color saturation, Filter: fixed increments Number of brackets: 3 frames
Self-timer	10 seconds (approx.)
Movie recording	Standard movie mode: 60 s (max.) with and without monaural audio Number of recorded pixels: 320 × 240; Frame rate: 15 frame/s Night movie mode (Images is monochrome.): 60 s (max.) with and without monaural audio Number of recorded pixels: 320 × 240; Frame rate: 15 frame/s UHS (Ultra High Speed) continuous-advance movie mode: Number of recorded pixels: 640 × 480; Frame rate: approx. 7 frame/s without audio Time-lapse movie mode: Number of recorded pixels: 2560 × 1920, 1600 × 1200, 1280 × 960, 640 × 480; Frame rate: 4 frame/s without audio
Audio	Voice memo: 5 or 15 seconds monaural audio with still image File format: WAVE
Audio signals	Two tones and two shutter sound effect settings
Exif tag information	Date and time, Camera settings: Exposure mode, shutter speed, Aperture value, Exposure compensation value, Metering method, Flash on / off, Camera sensitivity, White balance setting, Focal length, etc.
Delete function	Single, multiple, or all frames can be deleted
Format function	Available in the Play mode
Data imprinting	Year / month / day or Month / day / time, Text, Text and serial numbers
Digital zoom	2×
Dark frame subtraction	Yes in Bulb
Customizable interface	Yes (7hi)
Batteries	Four AA Ni-MH or alkaline batteries (Use of Ni-MH batteries is recommended.)
Battery performance (approx.) (Minolta measurement*)	Number of recording: 220 frames Continuous playback time: 120 minutes: 1700 mAh Ni-MH batteries, EVF on, external LCD monitor off, full-size images (2560 × 1920), Standard image quality, No instant playback, No voice memo, flash used with 50% of the frames
Operating time (approx.)	Start-up time: approx. 3 seconds shutter release time lag: 0.1 – 0.17 second
External power source	6 V DC (with specified AC adapter AC-1L or AC-2L); current rating: 2 A
PC interface	USB 1.1
AV output	PAL / NTSC
Dimensions (W×H×D)	117 × 90.5 × 112.5 mm / 4.6 × 3.6 × 4.4 inch
Weight	7Hi: 530 g / 18.7 ounce 7i: 525 g / 18.5 ounce without batteries or recording media
Standard accessories	Leather neck strap NS-DG1000 (7Hi), Neck Strap NS-DG7 (7i), Lens cap (49 mm) LF-1249, Accessory Shoe Cap SC-9, AV cable AVC-300, CF (CompactFlash) card (16MB), USB cable USB-100, DiMAGE Software CD-ROM (Includes DiMAGE Viewer), Lens Shade DLS-7Hi (7Hi), Lens Shade DLS-7i (7i), Four AA Ni-MH batteries, Ni-MH battery charger: Availability of accessories depends on areas.

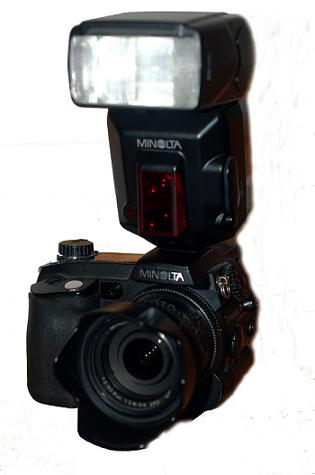
Minolta 7Hi with 5600HS(D) flash
