= Corfield =

Corfield is a surname. Notable people with the surname include:

- Bernard Corfield (1890–1965), Anglican Bishop of Travancore and Cochin
- Conrad Corfield (1893–1980), British civil servant
- Corrie Corfield (born 1961), British newsreader
- David Corfield, British philosopher
- Ella Corfield (nee Caird), British pharmacist
- Frederick Corfield (1915–2005), British politician
- Hermione Corfield (born 1993), British film and television actress
- Joe Corfield (1895–1970), Australian rules footballer
- John Corfield (1893–1953), British film producer
- Kenneth Corfield (1924–2016), British camera designer, engineer and businessman
- Lu Corfield (born 1979/80), Welsh actress
- Richard Corfield (1882–1913), British colonial police officer
- Richard Corfield (scientist) (born 1962), British scientist, science writer, and broadcaster
- Sid Corfield (1883–1941), English footballer
- William Henry Corfield (hygienist) (1843–1903), English hygienist
- William Henry Corfield (politician) (1843–1927), Australian politician
- William Corfield (footballer) (fl. 1890s), soccer player
- Wilmot Corfield (1859–1919), British philatelist

== Other ==
- Corfield, Queensland, locality in the Shire of Winton, Queensland, Australia
- K. G. Corfield Ltd, British camera and lens manufacturing company
- Corfield v. Coryell, 1823 US federal circuit court case
