= Big-box store =

Physically large retail establishment

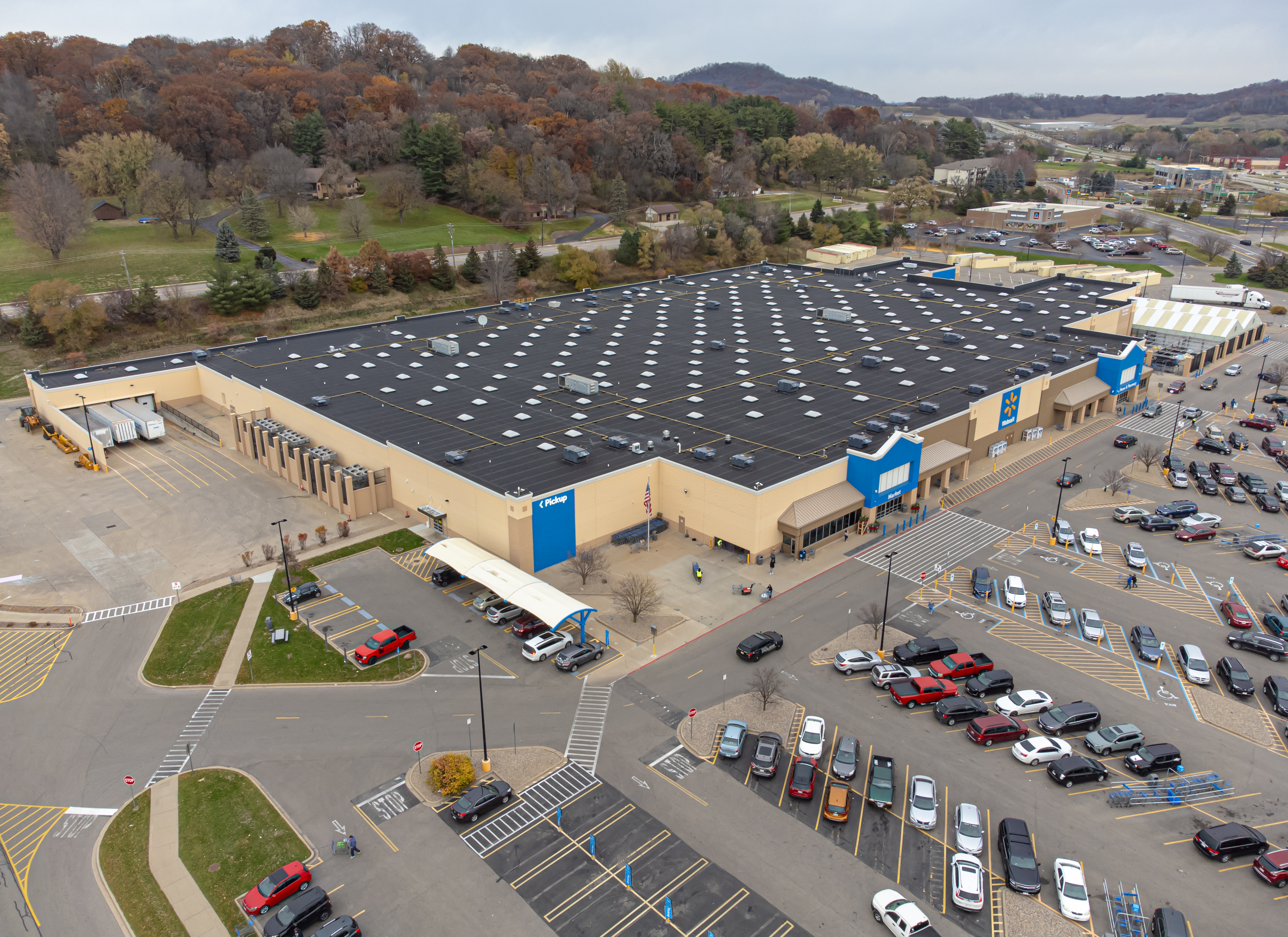
A Walmart Supercenter, a general merchandise big-box hypermarket in Onalaska, Wisconsin

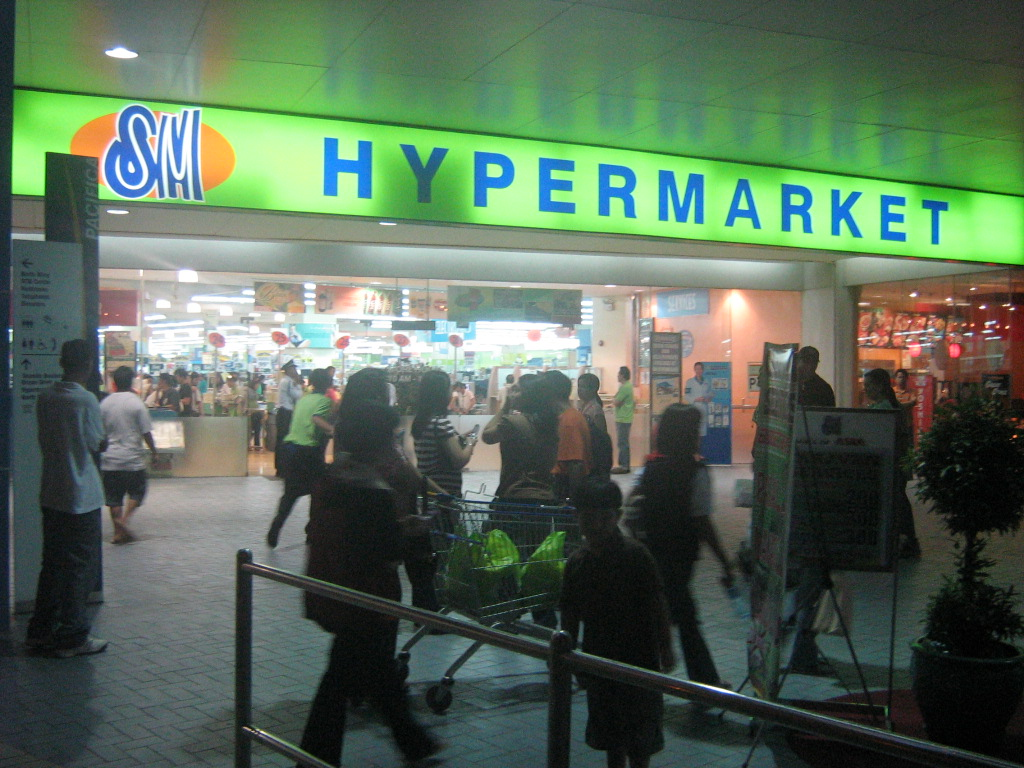
A SM Hypermarket, an Asian hypermarket in the Philippines, at SM Mall of Asia in Pasay, Metro Manila

A big-box store, hyperstore, hypermarket, supercenter, superstore, or megastore is a physically large retail establishment, usually part of a chain of stores. The term sometimes also refers, by extension, to the company that operates the store. The term "big-box" references the typical appearance of buildings occupied by such stores.

Commercially, big-box stores can be broken down into two categories: general merchandise (examples include Walmart and Target) and specialty stores (such as Home Depot, Barnes & Noble, IKEA or Best Buy), which specialize in goods within a specific range, such as hardware, books, furniture or consumer electronics, respectively. In the late 20th and early 21st centuries, many traditional retailers and supermarket chains that typically operate in smaller buildings, such as Tesco and Praktiker (the latter being defunct since 2014), opened stores in the big-box-store format in an effort to compete with big-box chains, which are expanding internationally as their home markets reach maturity.

Big box stores typically have business models focusing on high-volume, low-margin sales, with more than 200,000 different brands of merchandise generally available at any one time. The store may sell general dry goods, in which case it is a general merchandise retailer (however, traditional department stores, as the predecessor format, are generally not classified as "big box"), or may be limited to a particular specialty (such establishments are often called "category killers"), or may also sell groceries, in which case some countries (mostly in Europe) use the term hypermarket. In the U.S., there is no specific term for general merchandisers who also sell groceries. Both Target and Walmart offer groceries in most branches in the U.S.

Big-box stores are often clustered in shopping centers, which are typically called retail parks in the United Kingdom. In the United States, when they range in size from 250,000 square feet (23,000 m^{2}) to 600,000 square feet (56,000 m^{2}), they are often referred to as power centers. Because of their large footprints, many hypermarkets choose suburban or out-of-town locations that are often easily accessible by automobile and have lower rents.

== Big-box stores in various countries ==
=== Australia ===
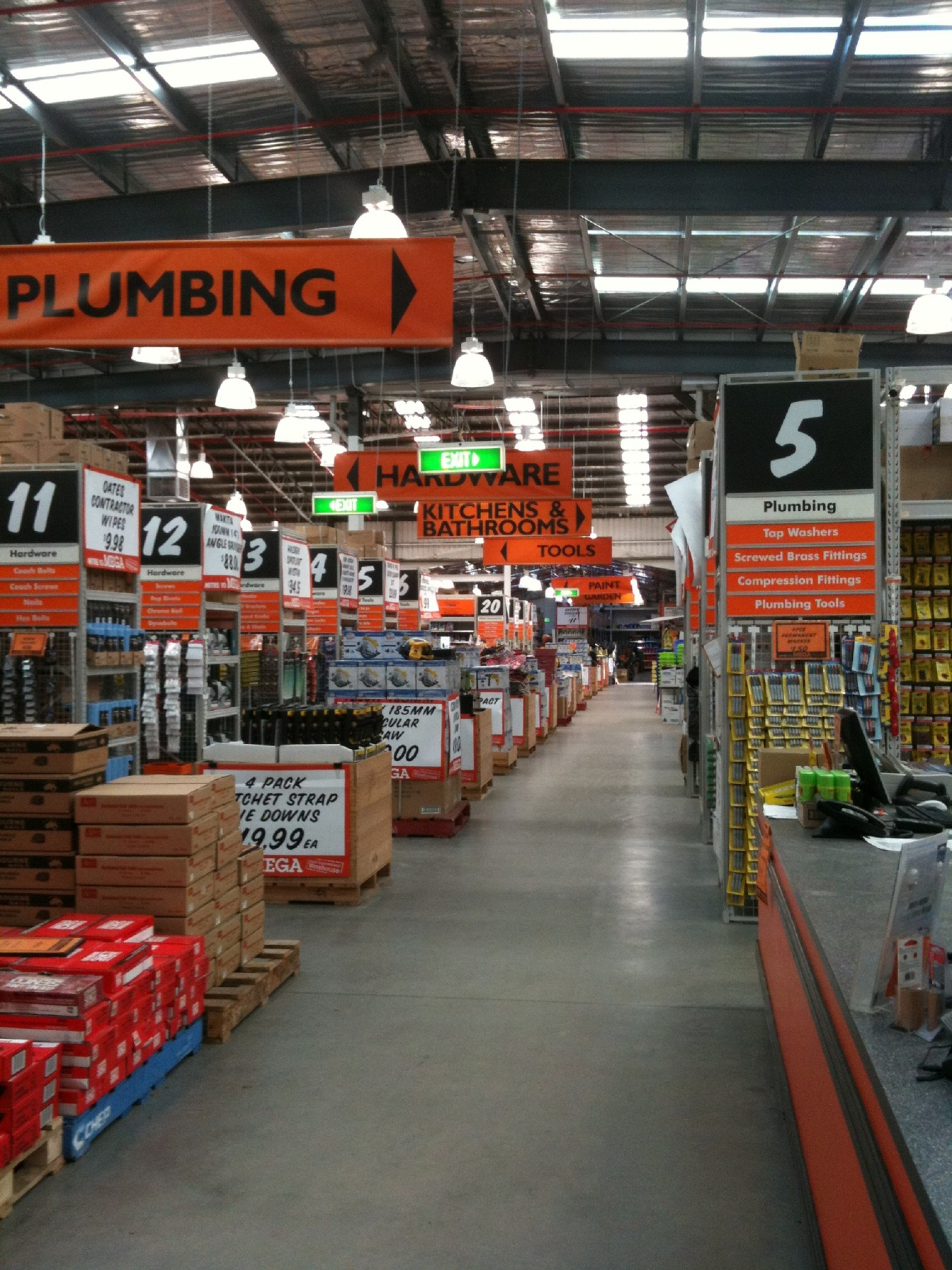
Interior of Mitre 10 MEGA, a big-box hardware store in Australia

In Australia, the retail category is known as "large format retail", encompasses bulky goods showrooms and more specialized retail categories within service or Highway commercial type land use zones.

In 1969, Kmart Australia opened its first five big-box type stores across Australia. The first opened in Burwood East, Melbourne, in April, followed by Blacktown in Greater Western Sydney, two stores in suburban Adelaide and a store in suburban Perth. IKEA began operation in Australia in 1975. Bunnings followed in 1995 and Mitre 10 adopted the model with the "Mitre 10 Mega" stores first opening at Beenleigh, Queensland, in 2004. Costco has since expanded across Australia since opening its first store in 2009.

=== Belgium ===
In 1961, following the repeal of Belgian laws that restricted department store sizes, the Belgian retailer Grand Bazar opened three hypermarkets under the name SuperBazar. The first, opened in Bruges on 9 September, covered 3,300 square meters (36,000 sq ft), while the second in Auderghem, Brussels, spanned 9,100 square meters (98,000 sq ft), marking it as a significant early example of the hypermarket concept.

It was Belgian market development engineer Maurice Cauwe, who adopted the concept from his frequent trips to the United States, particularly inspired from the Grand Union's "Grand Way" center in Paramus, New Jersey.

=== Canada ===
Apart from major American big-box stores such as Walmart Canada and briefly now-defunct Target Canada, there are many retail chains operating exclusively in Canada. These include stores such as (followed after each slash by the owner) Loblaws/Real Canadian Superstore, Rona, Winners/HomeSense, Canadian Tire/Mark's/Sport Chek, Shoppers Drug Mart, Chapters/Indigo Books and Music, Sobeys, and many others. Loblaw Companies Limited has expanded and multiplied its Real Canadian Superstore (and Maxi & Cie in Quebec) branded outlets to try to fill any genuine big-box market and fend off the damaging competition that a large Walmart penetration would inflict on Canadian-based retailers.

In the early 21st century, commercial developers in Canada such as RioCan chose to build big-box stores (often grouped together in so-called "power centres") in lieu of traditional shopping malls. Examples include Deerfoot Meadows (Calgary), Stonegate Shopping Centre and Preston Crossing (Saskatoon), South Edmonton Common (Edmonton), and Heartland Town Centre (Mississauga).

There are currently more than 300 power centres, which usually contain multiple big-box stores, located throughout Canada.

=== China ===
Most large grocery stores in China are of the big-box variety, selling big screen TVs, computers, mobile phones, bicycles, and clothing. Many foreign names appear, such as Carrefour, Auchan, Tesco, Lotte Mart, and Walmart, as well as dozens of Chinese chains. Most stores are three stories with moving sidewalk-style escalators. Some stores are so large as to have 60 checkout terminals and their own fleet of buses to bring customers to the store at no charge.

=== France ===
Many configurations exist: the hypermarket that sells many kinds of goods under one roof (like French chains Carrefour, Auchan, and E.Leclerc), most of which are integrated within a shopping mall; the supermarket that is a smaller version of a hypermarket; the market located in city centres; the department store (such as Le Bon Marché), which first appeared in Paris, then opened in other parts of the world; the "category killer" superstore that mainly sells goods in a particular domain (automotive, electronics, home furniture, etc.); and the warehouse store, like Metro Cash and Carry (for professionals only) and Costco, who opened its first store in June 2017.

=== Hong Kong ===
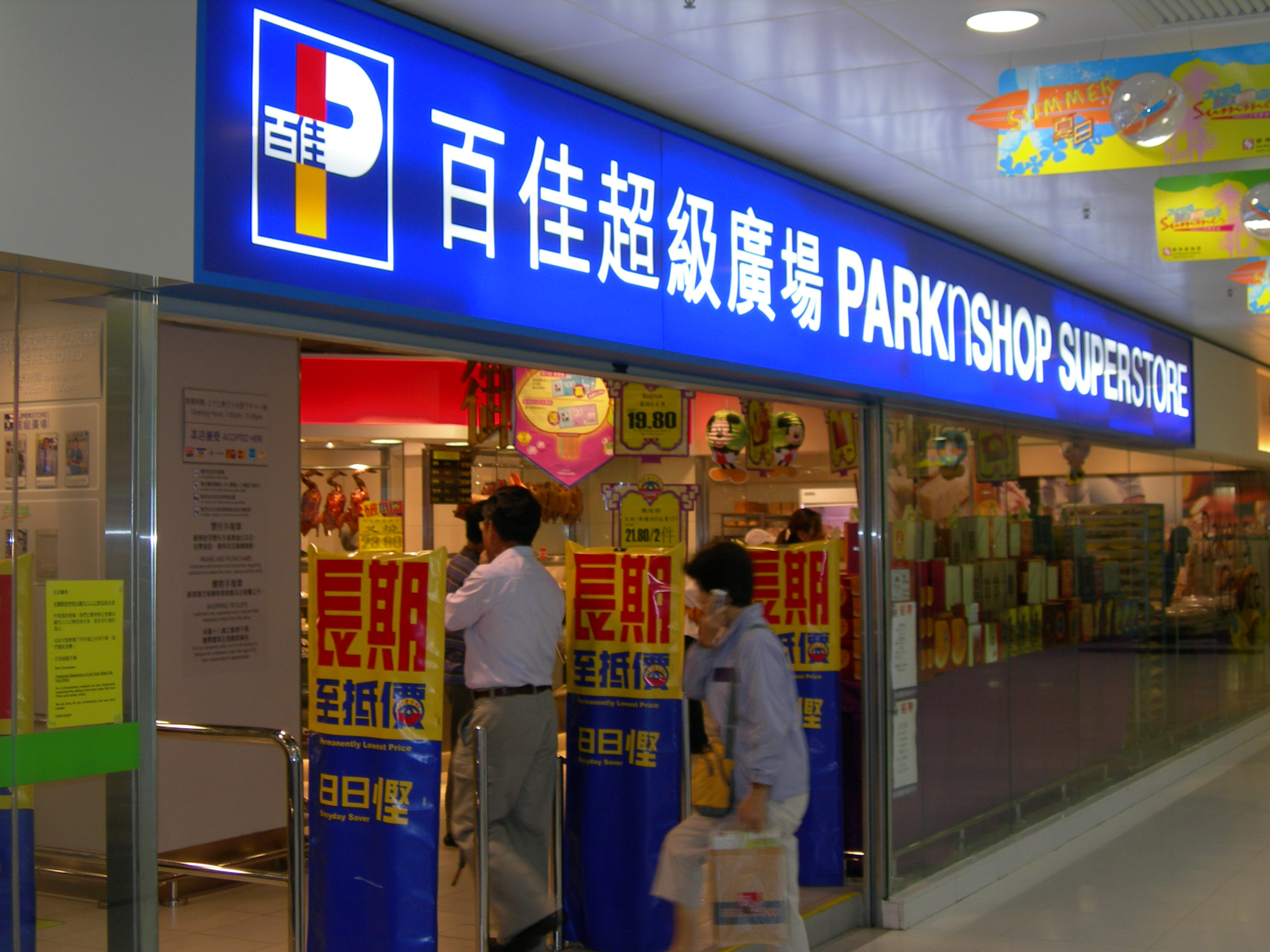
A ParknShop superstore at the Tai Po Mega Mall in Hong Kong

To contend against Carrefour, ParknShop opened the first superstore in 1996. Most superstores in Hong Kong emphasizes one-stop shopping, such as providing car park services. Today, Wellcome has more than 280 superstores and megastores, making it the largest superstore network in Hong Kong. The first ParknShop superstore opened in 1973 and it currently has 240 superstores across Hong Kong and Macau. By 2007, ParknShop and Wellcome had over 80% of supermarket trade in Hong Kong. In addition, China Resources Vanguard has four superstores in Hong Kong.

Because Hong Kong is a very densely populated city, the sizes of superstores are considerably smaller than those in other countries. Some superstores are running at deficit, such as Chelsea Heights which therefore has stopped selling fresh fish. Furthermore, some ParknShop superstores and megastores, such as Fortress World, belong to the same corporation, Hutchison Whampoa.

=== India ===
India has been going through a retail revolution since the late 1990s, following the introduction of Big Bazaar in 2001. However, even before that, large retail stores were not uncommon in India. Spencer's, a popular hypermart, traces its history as far back as 1863. Saravana Stores, operating as a large independent showroom format since 1969, has continued to expand significantly. Saravana Stores operating format is said to be the inspiration for Big Bazaar's Kishore Biyani.

Similarly, conglomerates, such as Raheja's, Future Group, Bharti, Godrej, Reliance, and TATA, have over the last decade ventured into large-format retail chains. However, most of the stores opened in large malls and not as independent big-box format stores, even though small and medium enterprises (SMEs) still account for the majority of the daily consumer transaction needs. DMart, owned by Avenue Supermarkets Limited, expanded widely, including into tier 2 and tier 3 cities.

An attempt was made to allow international large format retailers such as Walmart into the country. However, it was successfully opposed by small retailers citing job elimination due to increased efficiency and lowered prices due to fewer losses and lower costs.

Big-box format stores in India were opened by IKEA in the city of Hyderabad, and subsequently, in the city of Navi Mumbai.

=== Iran ===
Before 2009 (1388 ه.ش.), there were some local hypermarkets, but international branches were nonexistent. Despite their late arrival, hypermarkets in Iran have achieved a significant degree of growth. The first branch was opened in Tehran under the name of Iran Hyperstar through a collaboration between Carrefour and Majid Al Futtaim Group based in the United Arab Emirates. The Emirati holding is the main shareholder with about 75% of the company's shares. New branches were established after Iran Hyperstar’s first store found relative success. Now, other branches have been established in Tehran, Isfahan, Shiraz, Mashhad, Ahvaz, etc.

=== Republic of Ireland ===
In Ireland, large merchandise stores in the style of U.S. superstores were not a part of the retail sector until the late 20th century. Dunnes Stores has traditionally had a supermarket-plus-household-and-clothes model and now have some large stores. Tesco Ireland now runs upwards of 19 hypermarkets across the country.

=== New Zealand ===
The big-box phenomenon hit New Zealand in the late 1980s, with the introduction of Kmart Australia and later the "Warehouse" superstore, a local company. Mitre 10 New Zealand opened their first Mega in 2004 at Hastings six months before the Australian Mega store; it opened to great success with 20 more stores opening within two years. Australian-owned Bunnings Warehouse opened its first store in New Zealand in 2006.

=== United Kingdom ===
In the United Kingdom, Makro and Costco membership-only warehouse club stores have been around for four decades. General merchandise shops along the lines of U.S. superstores are not a large part of the retail sector, but this has been changing in recent years, with the creation of extra-large supermarkets such as Tesco and Asda selling a broader range of non-food goods, typically in out-of-town shopping centres or retail parks. As in the US, such large shops are sometimes called anchor tenants. The growth of online retail and budget retail has led to these chains moving away from the large out-of-town supermarkets which have waned in popularity.

The term "big-box store" is not used in the UK. "Superstore" is sometimes used, but with a slightly different meaning: on road signs it means "large supermarket"; in self-service shop names it denotes an outlet larger than that particular chain's usual size.

=== United States ===
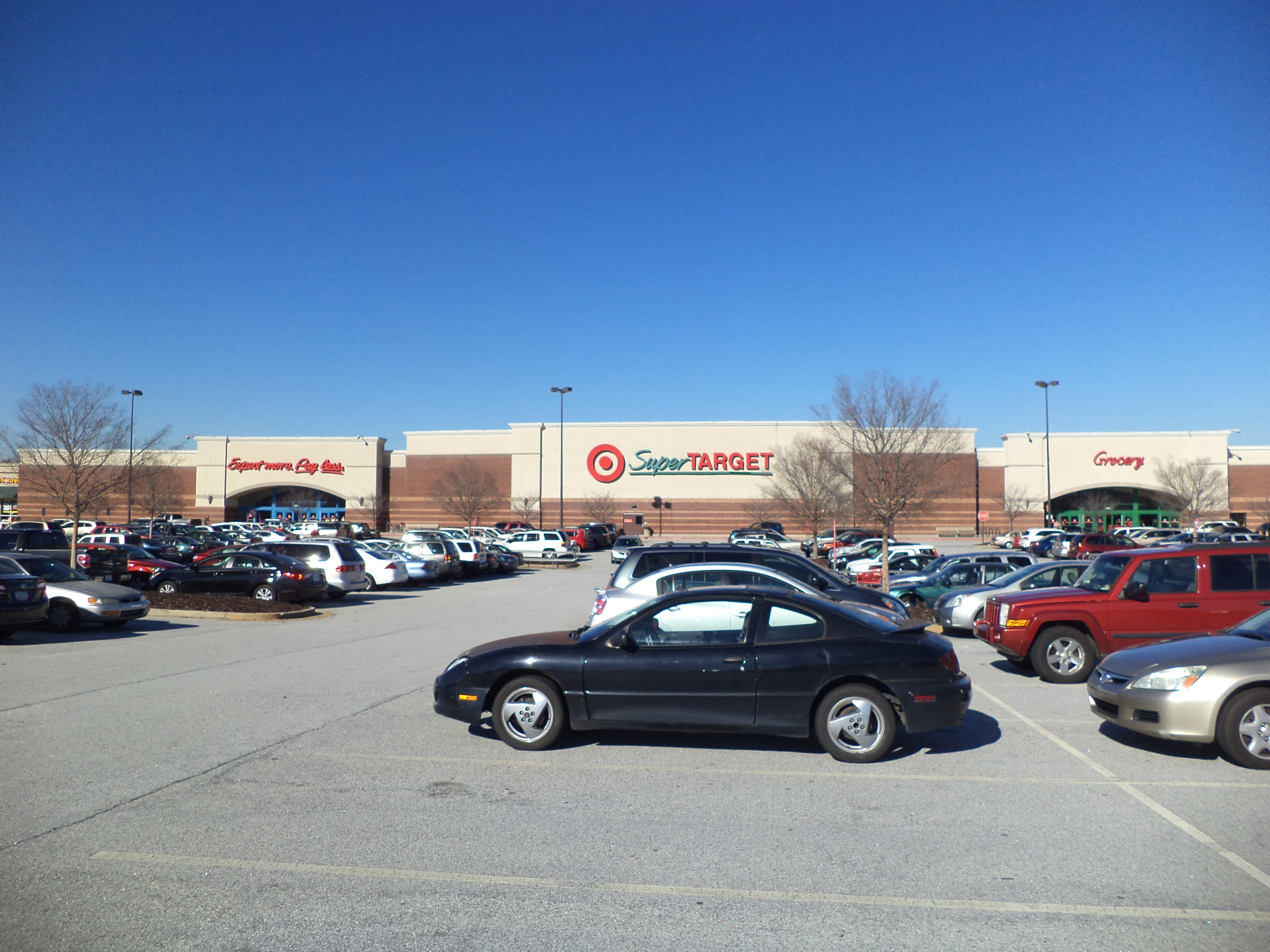
Exterior of a SuperTarget in McDonough, Georgia

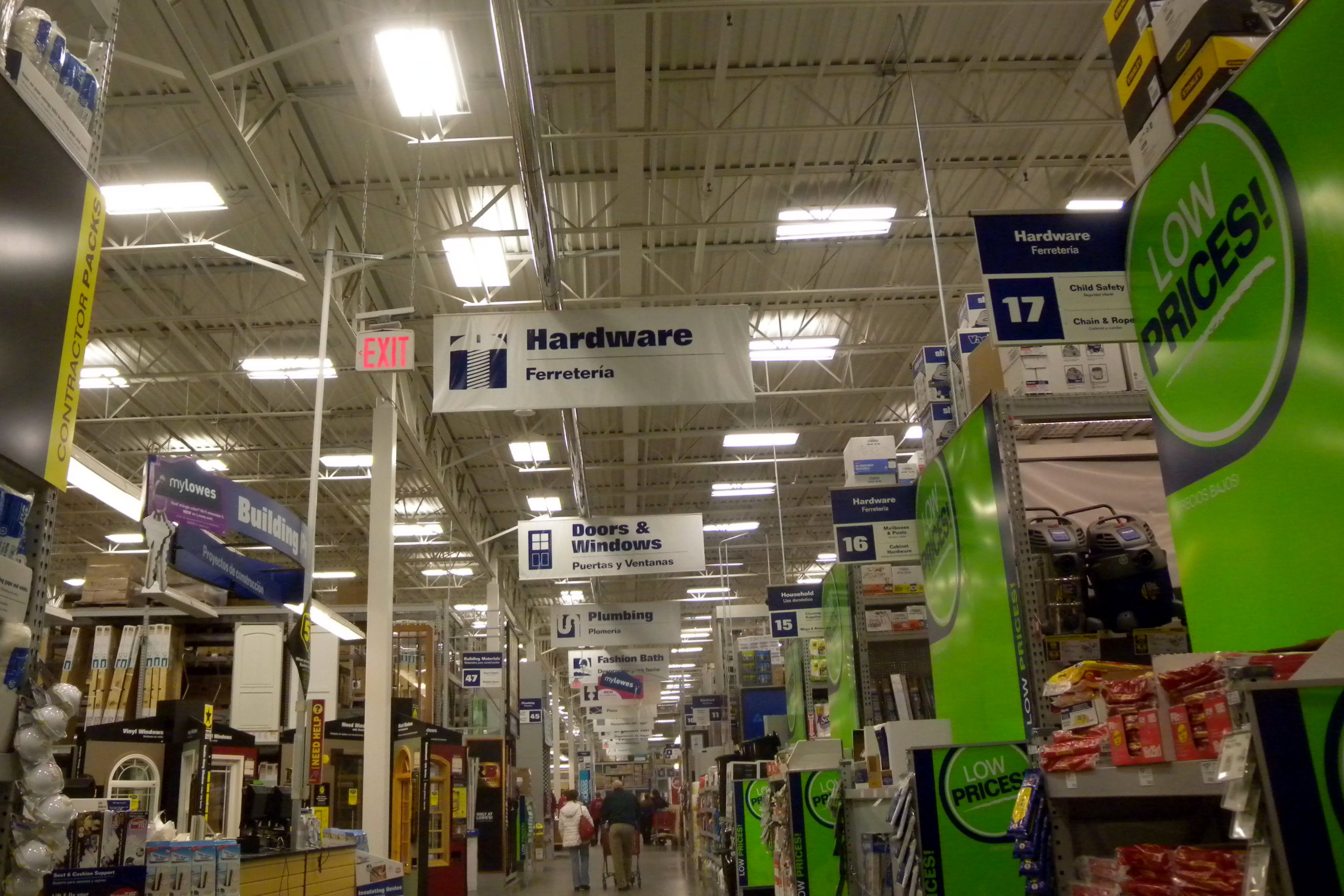
Interior of a Lowe's big-box hardware store in Brooklyn

In the United States, some big-box stores may specialize in categories of merchandise ("category killer"), such as Best Buy in electronics and appliances and Kohl's, Burlington, and Nordstrom Rack in apparel and home furnishings.

Big-box general merchandise retailers such as Target and Walmart are similar to the global concept of a hypermarket, although they do not always have a grocery section. The term "hypermarket" is not in common use in the United States; "superstore" is sometimes used, in addition to the industry term "general merchandise retailer." The category began in 1931, when Fred G. Meyer opened what he called a "one-stop shopping center" in Northeast Portland, Oregon. Meyer's format was imitated by Meijer in 1962 and later by Walmart, Kmart, Target (the discount brand of Dayton department store), and Woolco (the discount brand of the Woolworth department store) all opened. These were called "discount stores"—still an industry term for this type of store—and which between the 1960s and 1980s started to open larger-format stores called "megastores." These stores served the newly enlarged population of customers with cars, being located in suburbs and surrounded by ample parking lots. They were enabled by the decline of laws which prevented large retailers from getting bulk discounts.

Warehouse club stores are another category of big-box general merchandise stores, such as Sam's Club, Costco, and BJ's Wholesale Club. They require membership to purchase and often require purchasing larger quantities of goods at once.

=== Japan ===
The predecessor to Ito-Yokado was founded in 1920 selling western goods, went public in 1957, and switched to that name in 1965. Seibu Department Stores was founded in 1956, and opened up its grocery chain Seiyu Group in 1963. Isao Nakauchi founded the first Daiei in Kobe in 1957, selling clothing, electronics, furniture and groceries all in one store. Jusco was created in 1970, and eventually became known as Aeon.

In Japanese, hypermarkets are known as General Merchandise Stores (総合スーパー, Sōgō Sūpā). There is a distinction in Japanese between Supers (スーパー) and Departs (デパート) with the former being discounters, but the latter selling luxury brand clothing and quite often high-end groceries as well.

Hypermarkets are found in both urban and less populated areas in Japan. Their development is often supported by collaborative investment from financial institutions. Japanese hypermarkets may contain restaurants, manga (Japanese comic) stands, Internet cafés, typical department store merchandise, a full range of groceries, beauty salons and other services all in the same store. A recent trend has been to combine the dollar store concept with the hypermarket blueprint, giving rise to the "hyakkin plaza"—hyakkin (百均) or hyaku en (百円) means 100 yen (roughly 1 U.S. dollar).

== Typical architectural characteristics ==
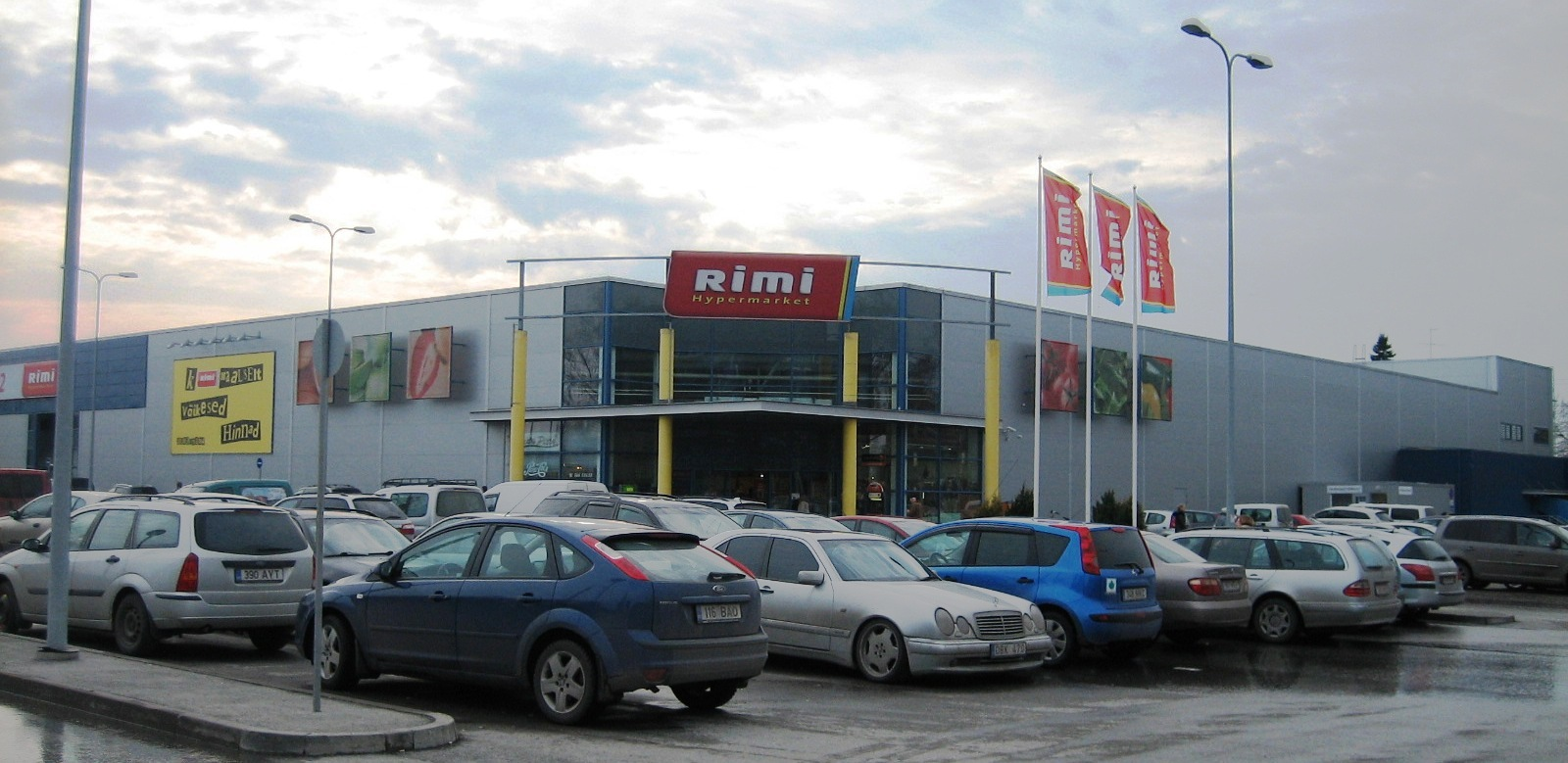
Rimi hypermarket in Lilleküla, Tallinn, Estonia

- Large, free-standing, shoebox, generally single-floor structure built on a concrete slab. The flat roof and ceiling trusses are generally made of steel, and the walls are concrete block clad in metal or masonry siding.
- The structure typically sits in the middle of a large, paved parking lot. The exterior is designed primarily for access by motor vehicles, rather than by pedestrians.
- Floor area several times greater than traditional retailers in the sector, providing for a large amount of merchandise; in North America, generally more than 50,000 square feet (4,650 m^{2}), sometimes approaching 200,000 square feet (18,600 m^{2}), though varying by sector and market. In countries where rentable space is at a premium, such as the United Kingdom, the relevant numbers are smaller and stores are more likely to have two or more floors.

== Criticism ==
=== Labor ===
Big-box development has at times been opposed by labor unions because the employees of such stores are usually not unionized. Unions such as the United Food and Commercial Workers Local 770 and the Joint Labor Management Committee of the Retail Food Industry have expressed concern about the grocery market because stores such as Kmart, Target, and Walmart now sell groceries. Unions and cities sometimes attempt to use land-use ordinances to restrict these businesses.

=== Urban planning ===
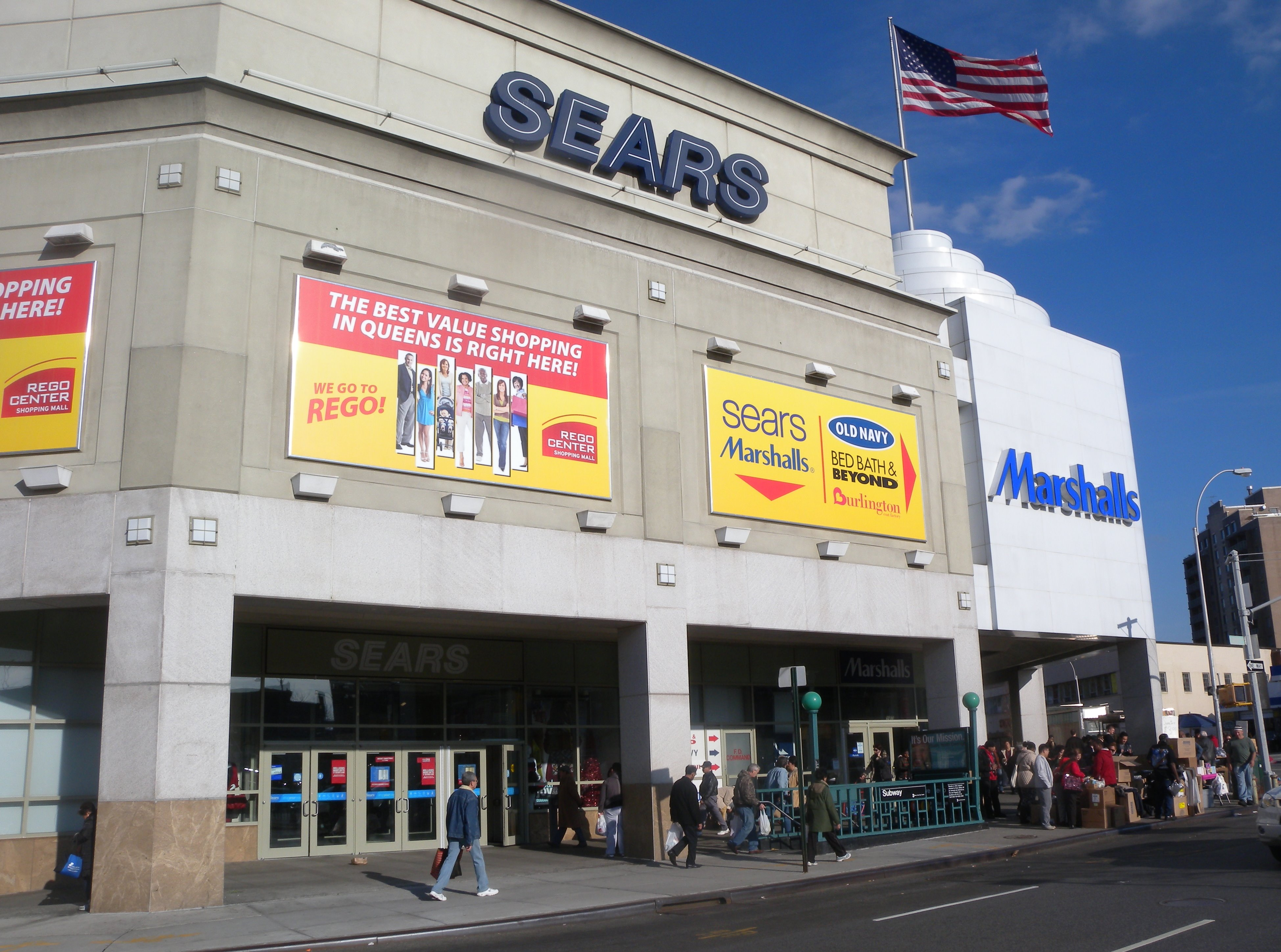
2011 photo of a Sears big box store with subway station in Rego Park, Queens, New York City, New York. This location closed in 2017 and was afterwards occupied by an IKEA store, which closed in 2022.

Because it is generally inaccessible to pedestrians and often can only be reached by motor vehicles, the big-box store has been criticized as unsustainable and a failure of urban planning.

=== Future ===
Despite its historical success, analysts such as Sanjeev Sanyal, former Deutsche Bank Global Strategist until 2015, have suggested that the hypermarket model may face challenges from online shopping and increasing demand for customized retail experiences. Sanyal has argued that some developing countries such as India may omit the hypermarket stage and directly go online.

== Warehouse club ==
Another category of stores sometimes included in the hypermarket category are the membership-based wholesale warehouse clubs that are popular in North America, pioneered by Fedco and today including Sam's Club, a division of Walmart; Costco, in which Carrefour owned some shares from 1985 to 1996; BJ's Wholesale Club on the East Coast; and Clubes City Club in Mexico. In Europe, Makro (owned by Metro AG) leads the market.

However, warehouse clubs differ from hypermarkets in that they have sparse interior decor and require paid membership. In addition, warehouse clubs usually sell bigger packages and have fewer choices in each category of items.

== See also ==
- List of superstores
- List of hypermarkets
- Supplier convergence
- Types of retail outlets
