= Westfield Southcenter =

Shopping mall in Tukwila, Washington

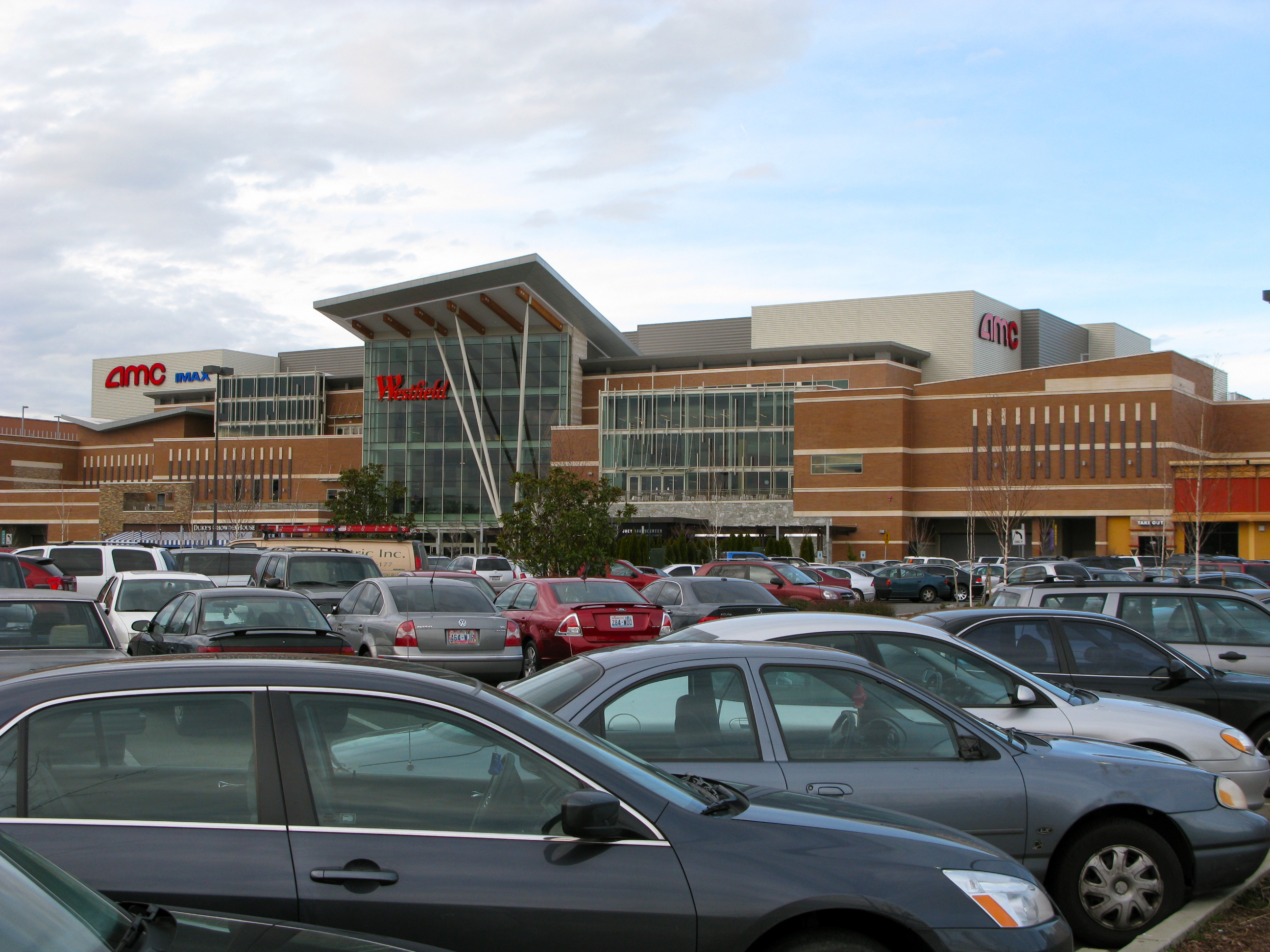
- The mall's atrium entrance in 2010
- Location: Tukwila, Washington, U.S.
- Coordinates: 47.459°N 122.258°W
- Opened: July 31, 1968; 58 years ago
- Developer: Allied Stores
- Manager: Unibail-Rodamco-Westfield
- Owner: Unibail-Rodamco-Westfield
- Num. of stores: 218
- Num. of anchor tenants: 6
- Floor area: 1,682,961 sq ft (156,352.2 m^{2})
- Floors: 3 (4 in JCPenney and Macy's)
- Parking: 7,143
- Website: westfield.com/southcenter

Westfield Southcenter, formerly known and still commonly referred to as Southcenter Mall, is a shopping mall located in Tukwila, Washington, United States. Owned by Unibail-Rodamco-Westfield, it is the largest shopping center in Washington state and the Pacific Northwest. The mall is anchored by Macy's (formerly The Bon Marché), JCPenney, Nordstrom, and also features an AMC movie theater, which opened in 2008. There is one vacant anchor space that was once a Sears store, and one vacant junior anchor that was once Forever 21.

== History ==
=== Early history and construction: 1956–1968 ===
In early 1956, three officials from Seattle's Northgate Shopping Center - James Douglas, president of Northgate Co., Wells McCurdy, Douglas' assistant, and Rex Allison, the vice president of Allied Department Stores - formed the Southcenter Corporation as a subsidiary of Allied. Their goal was to eventually build a large shopping center south of downtown Seattle that would match the success of their own Northgate and they began to search for a site, preferably of at least 100 acres. The site they chose was part of what was known as the Andover Tract, an 800-acre (3.2 km^{2}) area of former pasture land being developed by the Port of Seattle for industrial use. In anticipation of the developments, the entire area (947 acres; 383 ha) was annexed by the city of Tukwila in November 1957. Southcenter Corporation strategically purchased 160 acres (0.65 km^{2}) at what would eventually become the intersection of two major freeways, the Seattle-Tacoma Freeway (I-5) and I-405. The construction schedule of the mall was dependent on the construction of the freeways.

Excavation at the site began in early 1967, and construction of the $30 million shopping center began in the summer of that year. John Graham & Company, a Seattle firm that also designed the original Northgate and Tacoma Malls, was announced as the architect for the project. Even with four labor strikes slowing work down, construction was largely completed by May 1968; work on the interior continued until the day before the mall's opening. In total, 25 main contractors and 50 subcontractors were involved in the construction. The concrete terrazzo floors of the mall, which were a last-minute addition, were said to be the largest in area (85,000 square feet) in the entire Puget Sound region. 500 cubic yards of sand, 3,000 100-pound sacks of gray cement, 3,000 100-pound (45 kg) sacks of white cement and 5,000 100-pound (45 kg) sacks of brown marble chips were required to make the cement-like mixture for the floors. The floors were also fitted with 30,000 feet (9,100 m) of zinc divider strips.

The grand opening was held on July 31, 1968, at 11 a.m., with then-governor Daniel J. Evans as the key speaker. At 1,400,000 square feet (130,000 m^{2}) with 92 stores and 3,600 employees, it was the largest shopping mall in the region.

=== Westfield: since 2002 ===
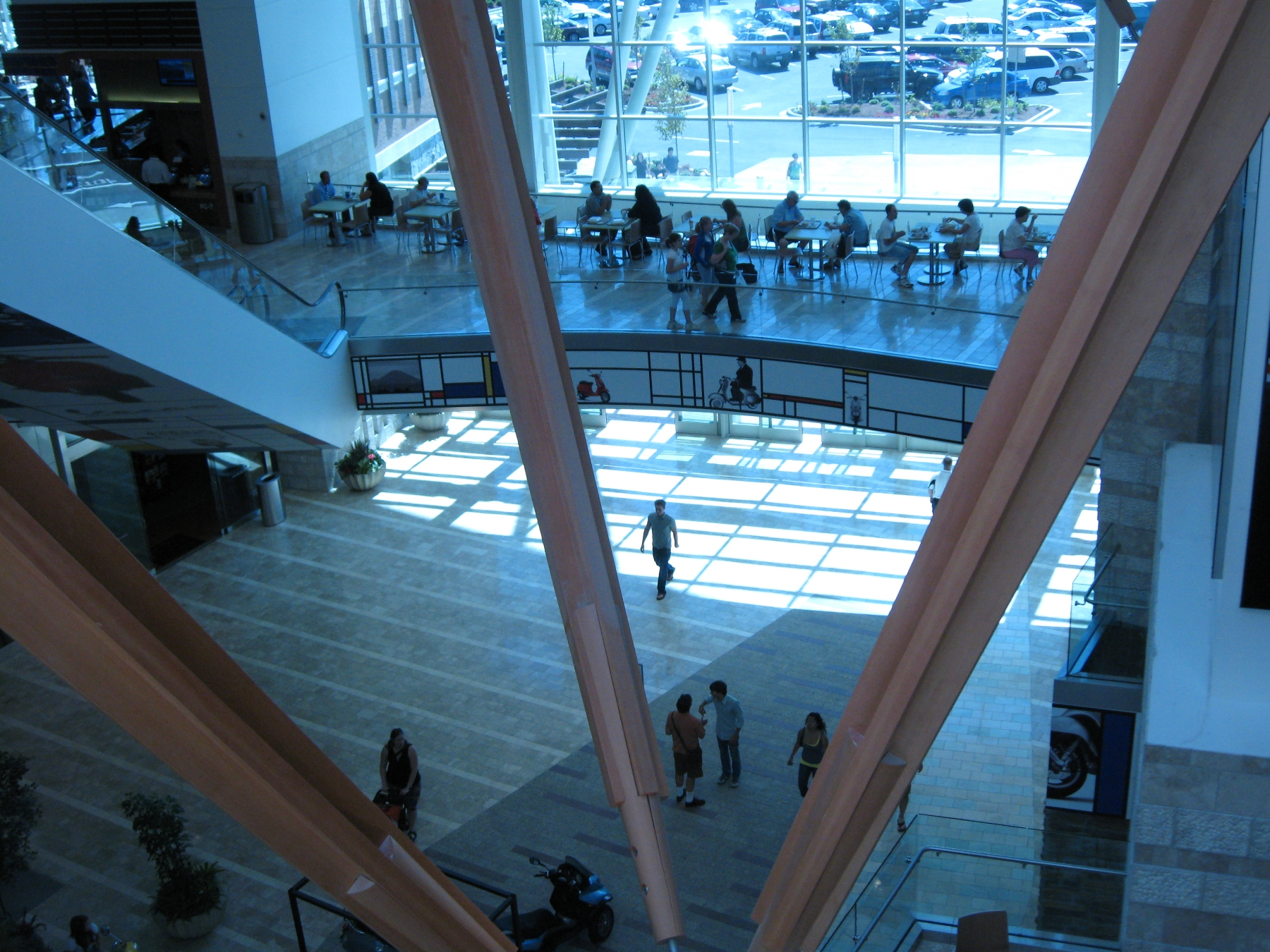
A view inside the atrium, looking down from the 3rd floor. Patrons eating at the dining terrace can be seen at top center.

In early 2002, the mall was purchased by the Westfield Group and renamed "Westfield Southcenter". On May 11, 2006, Westfield broke ground on a $240 million expansion, which increased its area by 400,000 square feet (37,000 m^{2}).

On July 22, 2010, Seafood City opened in the former Mervyn's space, and in 2014 The Container Store opened in the former Borders Books space. That same year the Westfield Group split its assets, with malls in North America and Europe being moved into the Westfield Corporation. In 2015, it was announced that the Rainforest Cafe would close in January 2016. It was replaced by a Chinese restaurant, Din Tai Fung, which opened in April 2017.

In December 2017, Westfield Corporation was purchased by the European shopping center giant Unibail-Rodamco, which appended its name to Unibail-Rodamco-Westfield. Its properties in North America and Europe were unified under the Westfield brand. An expansion with larger stores for Lululemon and The North Face as well as a "restaurant row" is planned to open in 2023 and 2024.

The Sears store at Southcenter was the last of the company's stores in Washington state and closed on December 15, 2024. The 175,000-square-foot (16,300 m^{2}) store opened in 1994 to replace its Renton location; the site at Southcenter had formerly been a Frederick & Nelson.
