= Standard Telephones and Cables =

British manufacturer of telecom equipment

STC plc
- Type: Public
- Industry: Telecommunications
- Founded: 1925
- Defunct: 1991
- Fate: Acquired
- Successor: Nortel
- Headquarters: London, UK
- Key people: Sir Kenneth Corfield (chairman)

Standard Telephones and Cables Ltd (later STC plc) was a British manufacturer of telephone, telegraph, radio, telecommunications, and related equipment. During its history, STC invented and developed several groundbreaking new technologies including pulse-code modulation (PCM) and optical fibres.

The company was founded in 1883 in London as International Western Electric by the Western Electric Company, shortly after Western Electric became the telephone equipment supplier for the American Telephone and Telegraph Company (AT&T) in the United States. In 1925, Western Electric divested itself of all foreign operations and sold International Western Electric to International Telephone and Telegraph (ITT), in part to thwart antitrust actions by the American government. In mid-1982, STC became an independent company and was listed on the London Stock Exchange; for a time it was a constituent of the FTSE 100 Index. It was bought by Nortel in 1991.

== History ==
=== Early days ===
The company was established in 1883 as an agent for Western Electric, which also had a factory in Antwerp, Belgium. The London operation sold US-designed telephones and exchanges to fledgling British telephone companies. Because of the costs of importing products, the company purchased a failing electrical cable factory at North Woolwich in London, in 1898. In addition to making lead-sheathed cables, the factory started assembling equipment from components imported from Belgium and the US, and subsequently introduced manufacturing. The company was incorporated as a British legal entity in 1910.

World War I brought its progress to a sudden halt. The company contributed to the war effort in military communications with its cable and Wireless technologies. With radio technology rapidly developing in the USA after the war, Western Electric had an advantage when radio broadcasting was introduced in Britain. As well as manufacturing radio receivers, the company, in a consortium with its competitors, set up the British Broadcasting Company (BBC) in 1922. Electron tube technology was commercially exploited.

=== Inter-war growth ===
In 1925, Western Electric sold off its international operations, as well as the general electrical equipment merchandizing operations. The buyer of the international operations was the infant ITT Corporation, founded by Sosthenes Behn less than ten years previously with an aggressive and thrusting reputation. To fit with its other worldwide operations, ITT renamed its new UK operation Standard Telephones and Cables, its name implying a standard against which others would be measured. The new organization employed entrepreneurial risk taking, based on solid research and brave innovation.

In 1933, Brimar was established to manufacture American-pattern electron tubes at Foots Cray, adjacent to the Kolster-Brandes factory.

Within a few years, multi-channel transmission (1932), microwave transmission (1934), coaxial cabling (1936), the entire radio systems for the liners Queen Mary and Queen Elizabeth (1936–39), the patenting of pulse-code modulation (1938) all contributed to the hey-day of telephony's development.

Between 1939 and 1945, significant military work was undertaken with many developments particularly with regard to aerial warfare: communications, radar, navigational aids, and especially OBOE.

=== Emergence of telecommunications ===
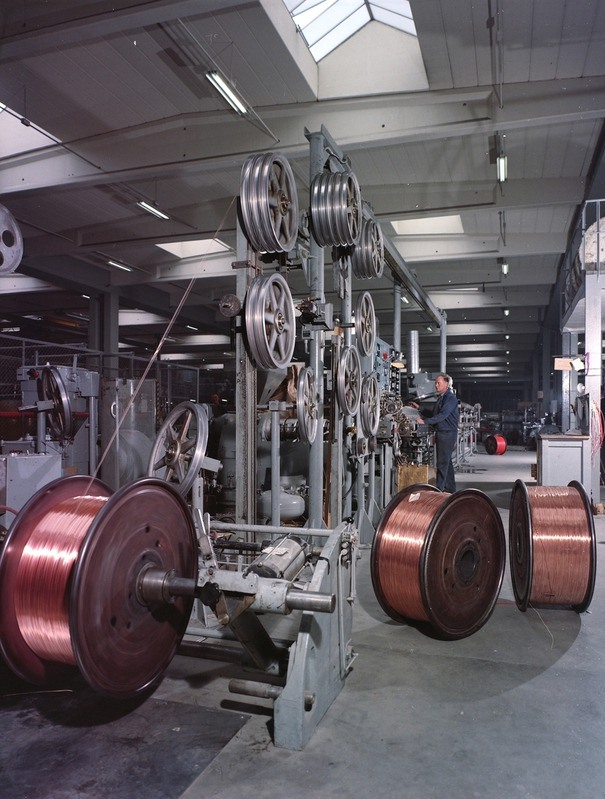
Manufacturing at STC's Oslo, Norway-facility in 1965

The 1950s were characterised by the establishment of television broadcasting. Technical milestones were numerous and were crowned by the coverage of Queen Elizabeth II's Coronation in 1953. The steady spread of TV transmission and availability over Britain very often used STC technology and equipment.

In other areas, ship-to-ship, ship-to-shore and civil aviation communications took on modern characteristics with STC's products. In time, international and intercontinental submarine telephone contact became possible, feasible and then everyday. Questions of product and installation quality and absolute reliability were overcome and STC became a major player with its production unit in Southampton opened in 1956. Coverage graduated from rivers, estuaries, the English Channel, the North Sea, the Atlantic to the Pacific Oceans. STC became the world leader in this field after acquiring Submarine Cables Ltd in 1970.

In the late 1940s and early 1950s, STC also supplied signalbox train describer equipment to British Railways; for the 1949 installation of power signalling in the North and South boxes at Doncaster, STC also provided route setting panels for control of points and signals, using a novel "sequential switch interlocking" format based around telephone exchange switching technology.

Digital technology began to supplant analogue with Bell's invention of transistors. STC's first PCM link in 1964 had waited nearly 30 years for material technology to make it work.

=== Digital age ===
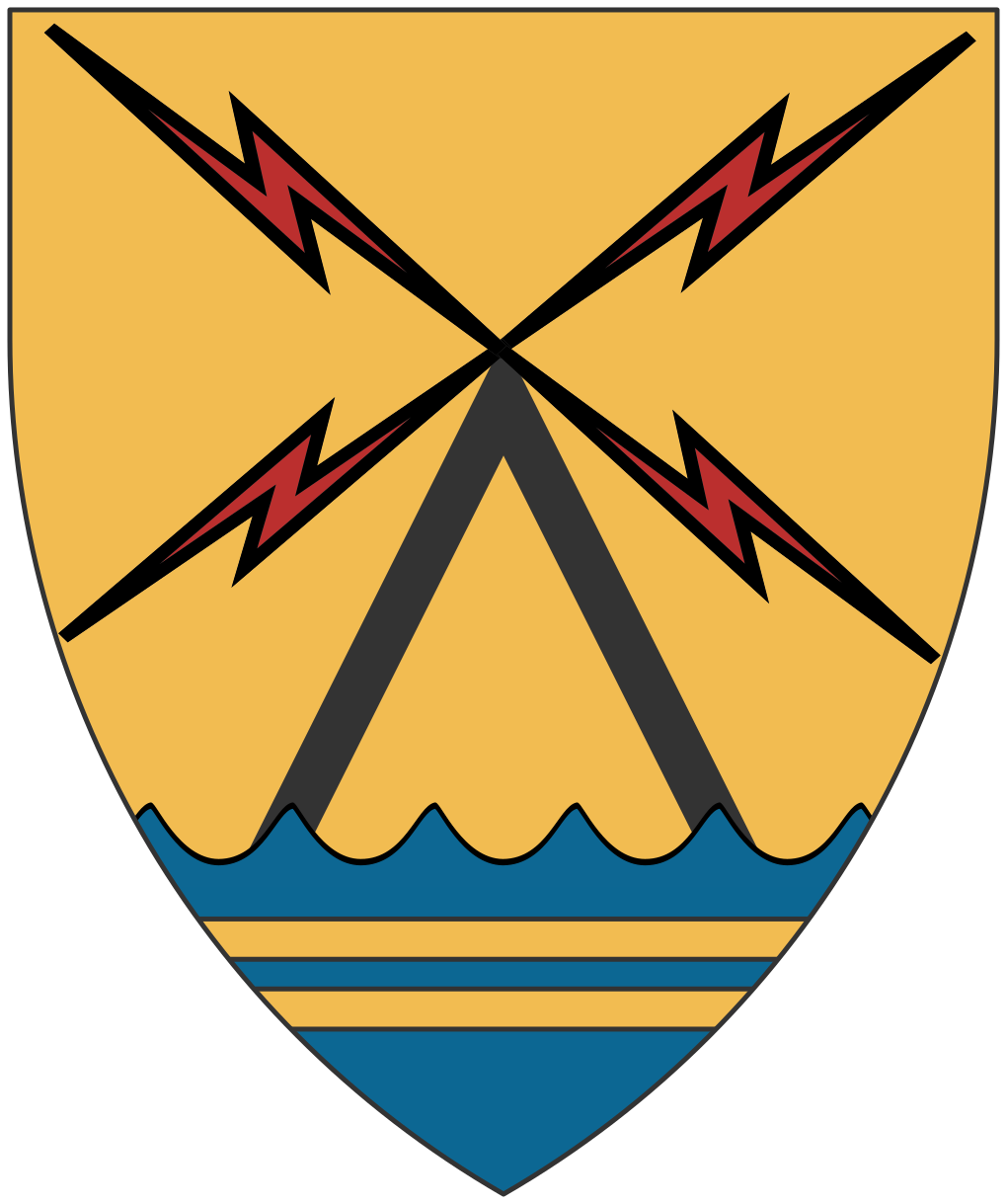
Arms of Standard Telephones and Cables Ltd

In 1966, Charles Kao of STC's Standard Telecommunication Laboratories in Harlow demonstrated that light rather than electricity could be used to transmit speech and (more importantly) data accurately at very high speeds. Again materials technology took time to catch up, but by 1977 a commercial fibre optic link had been installed in England. Within ten years BT abandoned metal cables except at the subscriber's premises. Before STC's demise, its plant at Wednesbury Street, Newport came to dominate the recabling of the UK public telephone system.

In telephone switching apparatus, STC (New Southgate) was also a major player. In 1971 the company installed a fully digital (PCM) controlled telephone exchange at Moorgate in the City of London. It was a tandem exchange, switching PCM multiplexes between several other exchanges. Until 1980, STC's TXE4 analogue electronic switch was an early replacement for electro-mechanical systems. Before a politically engineered withdrawal in 1982, STC and its (now equally defunct) partners Plessey and GEC, developed the fully digital System X switch which is still in service in the UK as of 2005.

=== Decline and sale ===
ITT Corporation needed to raise cash to fund continued development of its System 12 telephone switching system and sold off all but a minority shareholding of STC between 1979 and 1982.

With developments in computer technology influencing and stimulating telecoms, the buzzword of the late 1980s became "convergence". An attempt to enter the mainframe computer market with the takeover of ICL led to financial strains. The rationale was the convergence of computing and telecoms but the vision was too early. Almost immediately, STC had financial problems and ICL was ring-fenced to preserve it as a profit centre. By 1991, with an ageing workforce, loss of business from the newly privatised BT, production spread over too many expensive sites and no clear leadership succession to its former chairman, Sir Kenneth Corfield, STC was bought by Canadian company Northern Telecom (Nortel).

== Operations ==
The company was based in the United Kingdom but also had an operation in Australia, which was acquired by Alcatel Australia in 1987.
