= Leica copies =

Camera clones

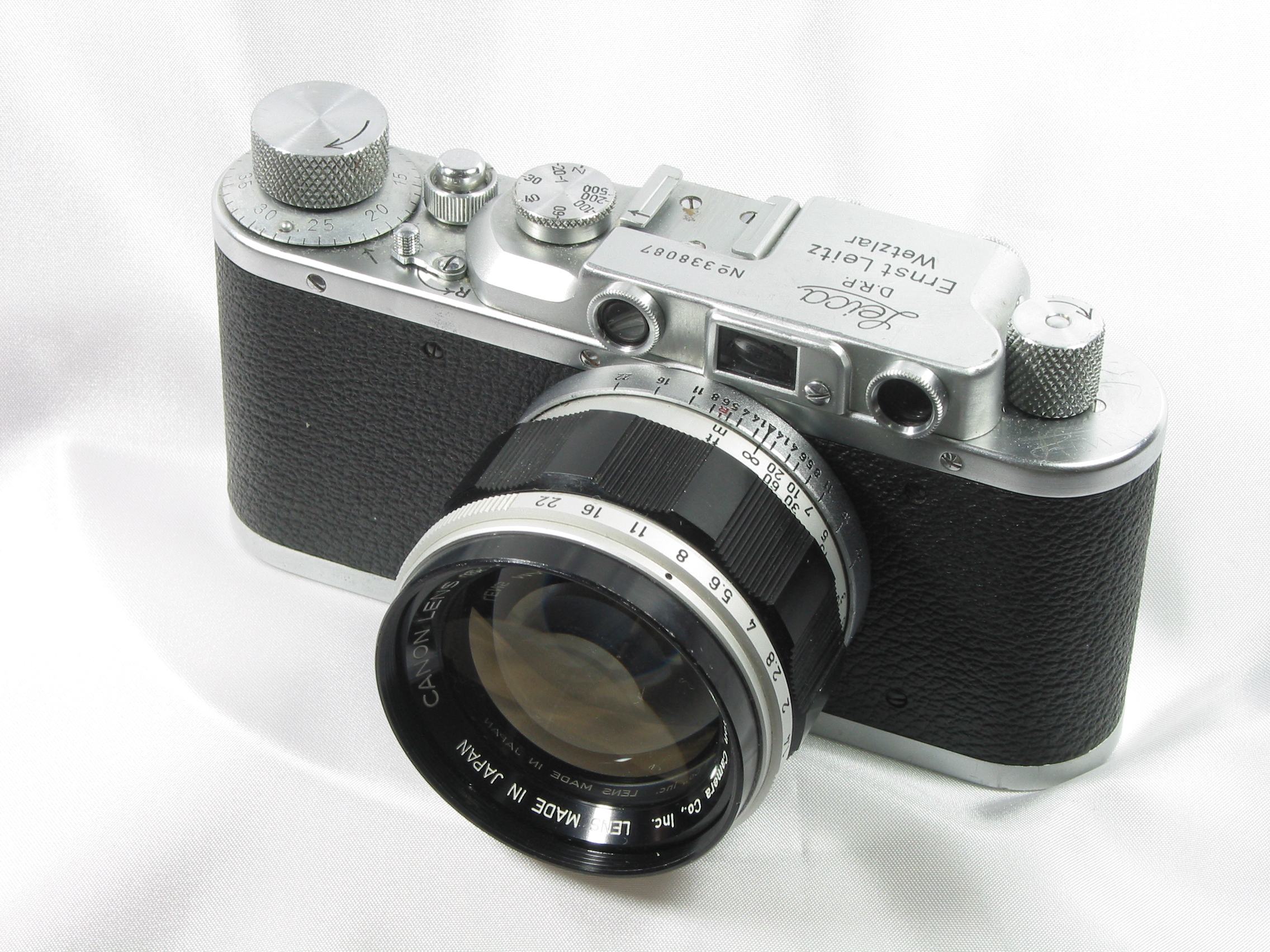
Leica II (1939), with a later Canon lens

The Leica copies originate from the Leica camera that was launched by Ernst Leitz, Wetzlar in 1925, using the Leica 39mm screw mount of 26 threads per inch (25.4 mm), and the standard 35mm film. The design was carried out by Oskar Barnack, beginning in 1913 by building a camera for 24×36 mm negatives that by now is called the Ur-Leica, or Barnack Leica; but Ernst Leitz did not decide to manufacture it until 1924. Once started, the Leica production volume doubled each year; in 1929, some 16.000 cameras were produced. In 1930, an improved model with interchangeable lens was introduced, followed a year later by the fully developed Leica II with standardized film to lens flange distance, and in 1932 the basic Leica Standard; the Leica concept was established. This camera's features are the basis for defining a Leica copy.

The post 1932 Leica II and Leica III cameras were differentiated by the latter having a "slow speed dial" on the front of the camera to the left of the lens mount. After 1940, with the introduction of the Leica IIIc, the upper body was die cast rather than stamped and the visual appearance of the camera changed with a more prominent shutter-crate around the lens mount -- this was not covered with leather as in the previous models. The Soviet cameras followed the pattern of the Leica II, while most of the Asian cameras included the slow-speed feature. The earlier copies used the stamped upper body, while a few of the later cameras had die cast upper bodies. Several of the Asian brands combined the viewfinder and rangefinder features, this was not done on the Barnack Leica cameras or Soviet copies.

After World War II, the Allied countries made all German patents in their country available to the public free of charge. Ernst Leitz had no patents registered in the USSR. Cameras introduced later would not cause patent rights infringements as far as the early Leica models are concerned.

One set of specifications which may define a Leica copy, are described by Hans P. Rajner, is:

- 1 - Predominantly a rangefinder/viewfinder camera type
- 2 - With the 39mm Leica screw lens mount with approximately 1 mm pitch
- 3 - and a 28.8 mm film to lens flange distance
- 4 - Using the 35mm film format
- 5 - And employing a focal-plane shutter

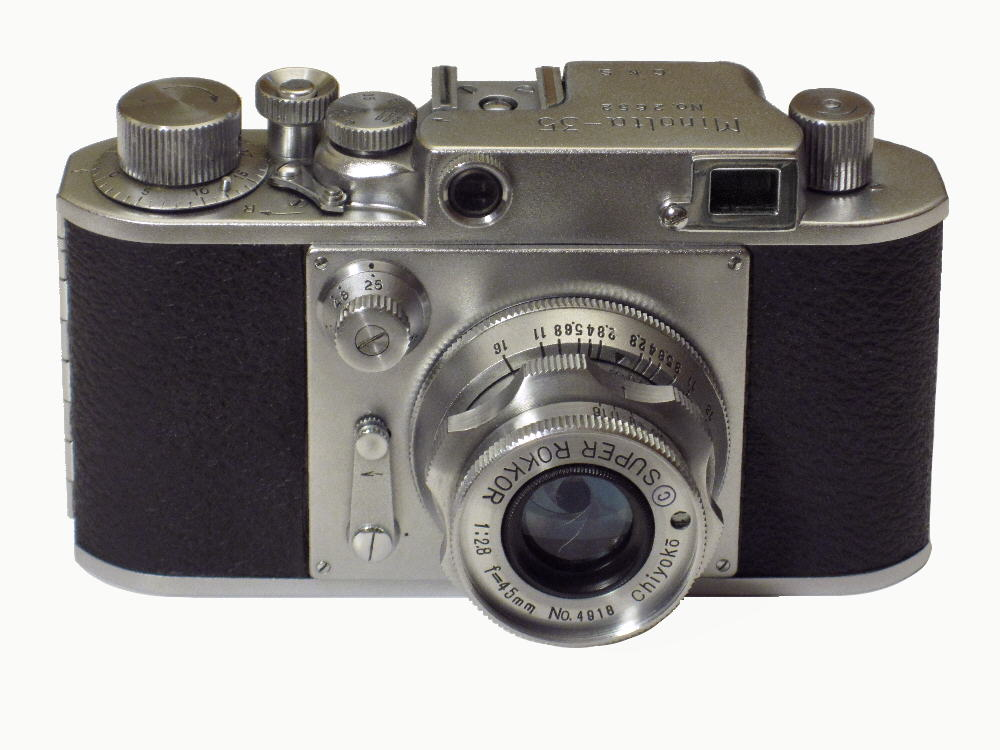
Minolta-35 (1947)

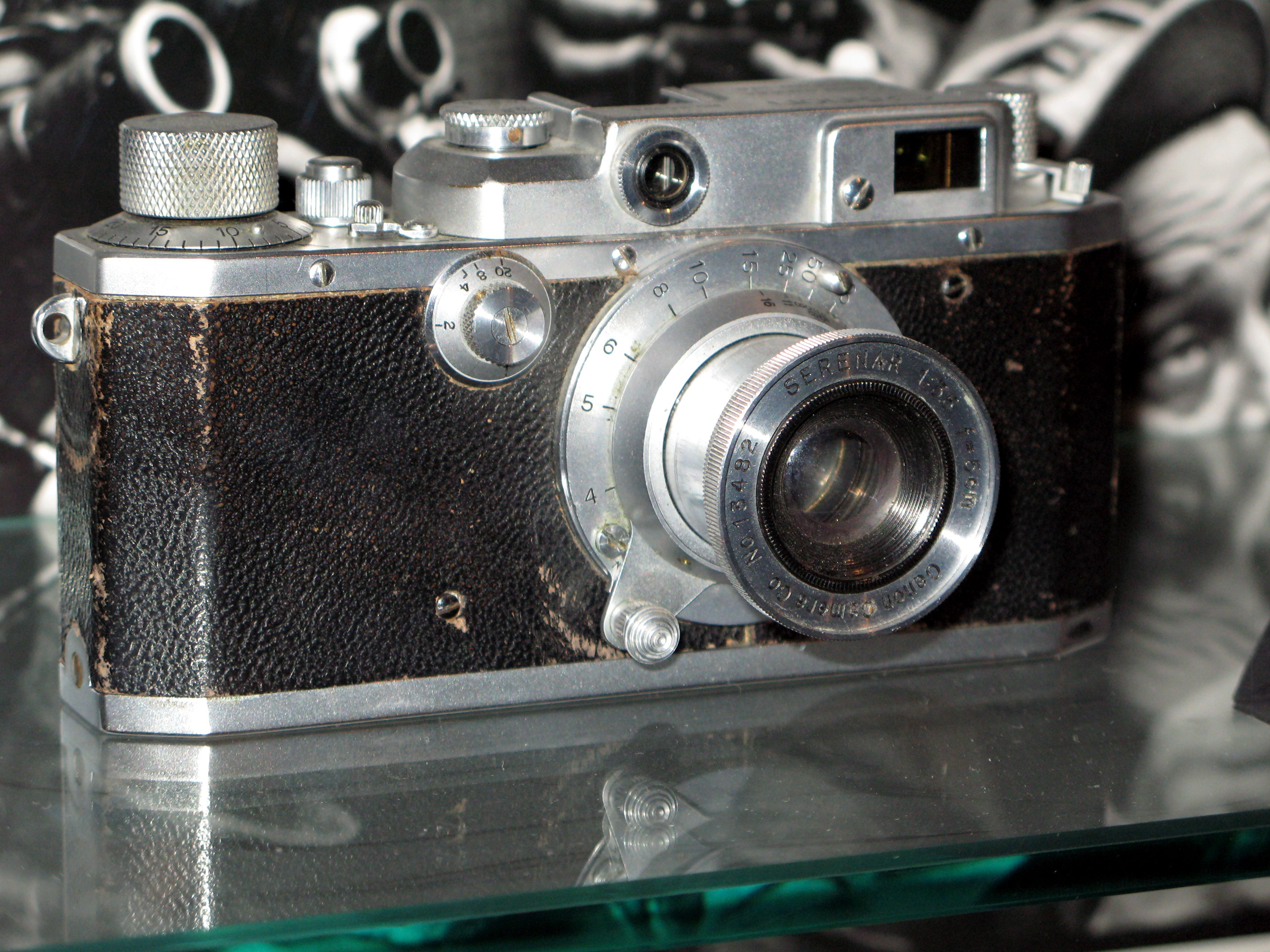
Canon IIB (1951)

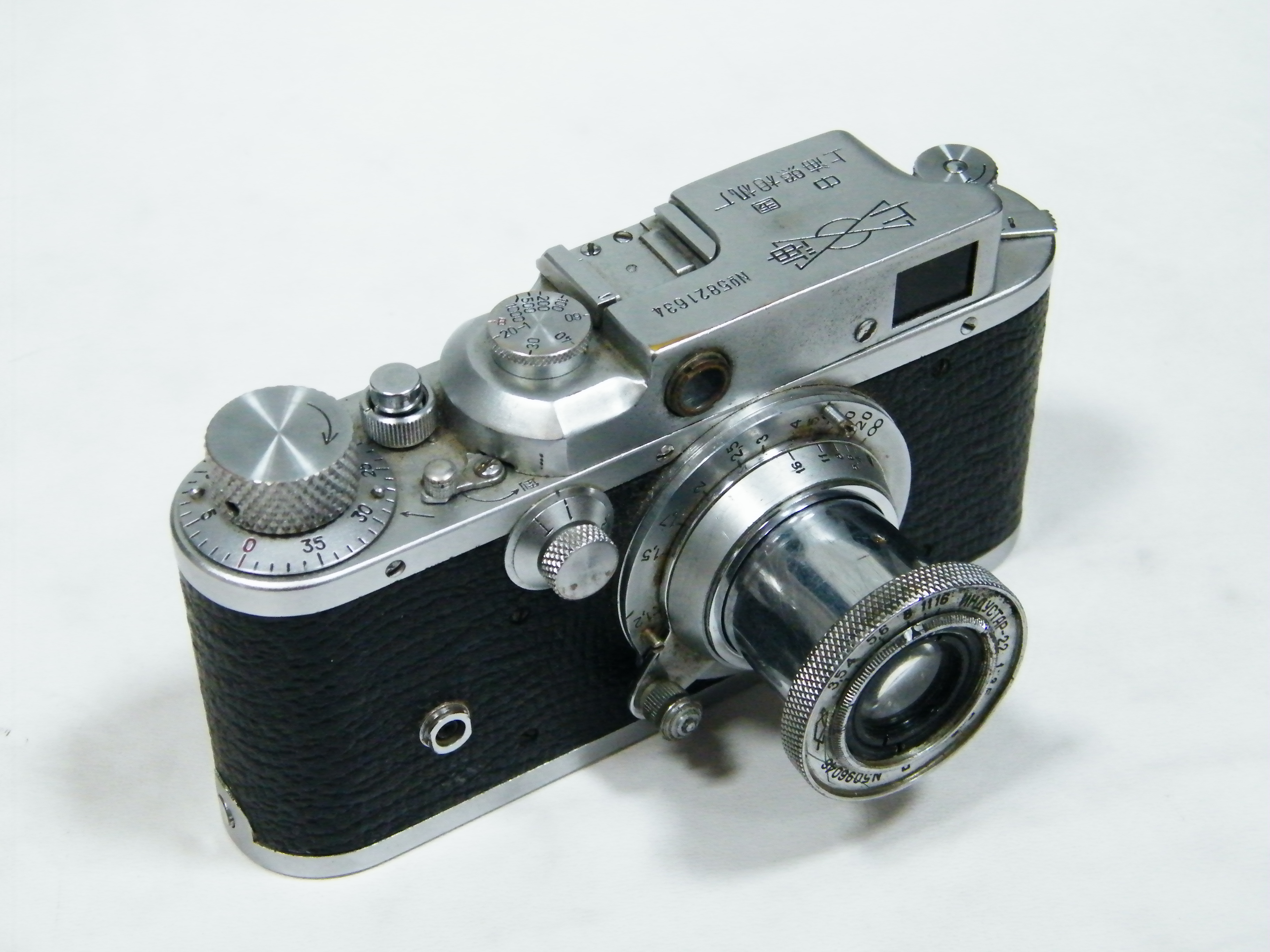
Shanghai (1958)

Some 500 individual camera models that were produced by a large number of camera manufacturers since the introduction of the Leica fall into this category. These originate from about 21 original Leica inspired cameras. However, some of these never made it past the prototype stage, and some came on the market only in very small quantities. There are differing opinions on when the Canon (Kwanon)line of cameras became Leica copies; the earliest of these had Leica inspired bodies, but Contax inspired lens mounts and Nikkor lenses. Those brands that made it to the market by more than a few thousands are listed here.

(Only the first model by each manufacturer is mentioned, while the indicated period encompasses the entire range of models until the end of production)

- 1934 - 1990: The FED manufactured in the Kharkov labour commune in USSR.
- 1934 - 1968: Kwanon (later Canon) manufactured in Japan by Seiki Kogaku, Tokyo, but see discussion page.
- 1940 - 1961: The Leotax manufactured in Japan by Showa Kogaku, Tokyo.
- 1947 - 1959: The Minolta-35 manufactured by Chiyoda Kogaku, Osaka (24×32 mm at first).
- 1947 - 1954: Kardon manufactured by Premier Instrument Corp., New York, USA.
- 1948 - 1959: Nicca manufactured in Japan by Nippon Camera Co. Ltd, Tokyo.
- 1948 - 1977: Zorki manufactured in USSR by KMZ, Krasnogorsk.
- 1951 - 1964: Reid Post WWII by Reid and Sigrist from seized Leitz plans
- 1953 - 1959: Tanack IIC manufactured in Japan by Tanaka Optical Co., Tokyo.
- 1953 - 1961: Periflex manufactured in England by K. G. Corfield Ltd. Wolverhampton.
- 1958 - 1963: Shanghai 58-I manufactured in China by Shanghai Camera Factory.
- 1959 - 1960: Yashica YE manufactured by Yashica as a continuation of the Nicca range.

Note: Some 35mm rangefinder cameras were also partly inspired by the Zeiss Ikon Contax. Among these belong the 1935 Canon and the 1948 Nikon rangefinder camera.
