= Telecommunications company =

Organization that provides telephone and/or other telecommunications services

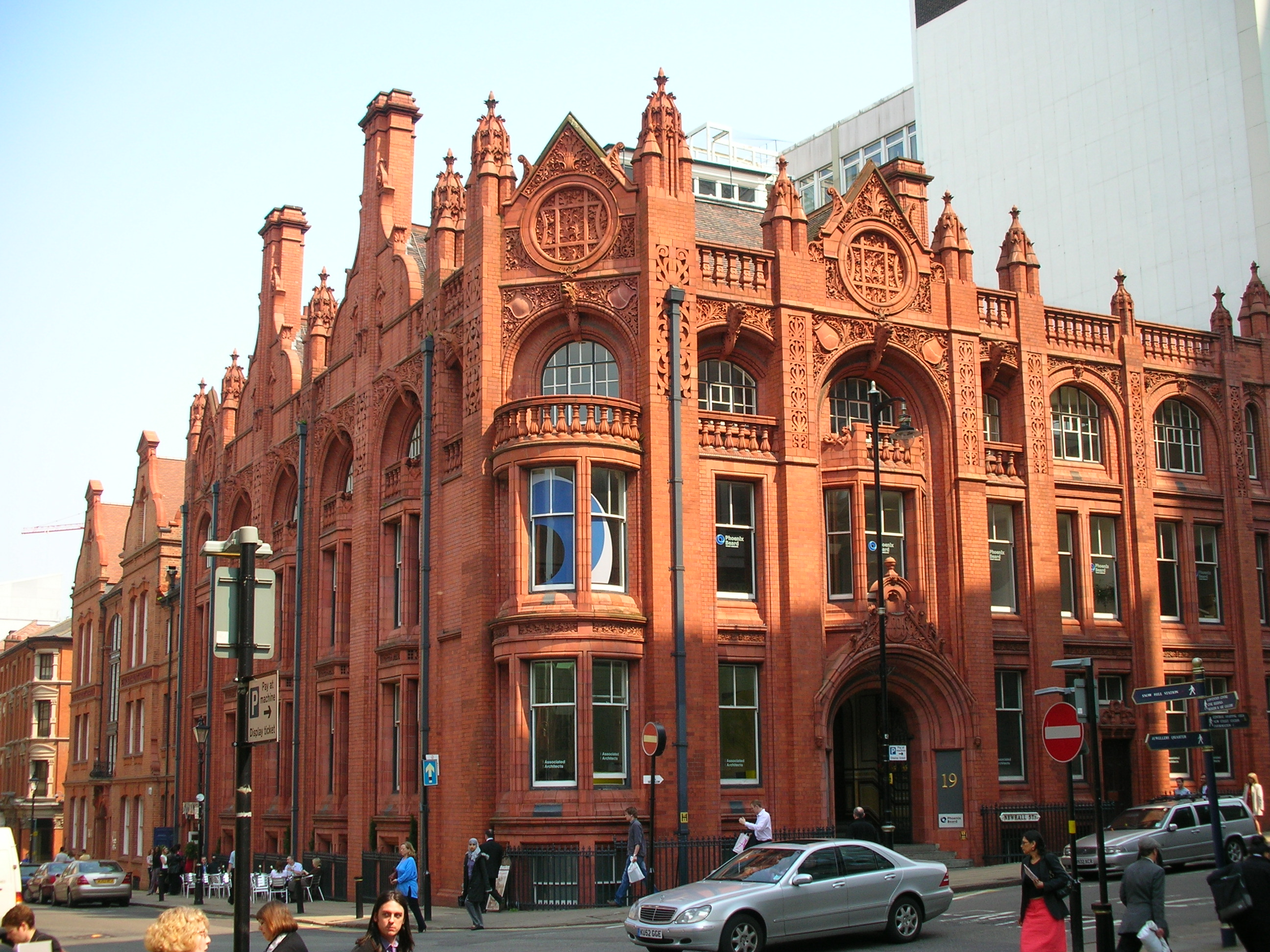
The Edison Bell Telephone Company building of 1896 in Birmingham, England

A telecommunications company (Note: Abbreviated as telco. Alternative names include telephone service provider, telephone company or telecommunications operator.) is an electronic communications service provider, more precisely a telecommunications service provider (TSP), that provides telecommunications services such as telephony and data communications access. Many formerly solely telephone companies now function as internet service providers (ISPs), and the distinction between a telephone company and ISP has faded as the current trend for supplier convergence in the industry develops. Additionally, with advances in technology, other industries such as cable television, Voice-over IP (VoIP), and satellite providers offer similar competing services as the telephone companies to both residential and businesses customers.

Due to the nature of capital expenditure involved in the past, most telecommunications companies were government-owned agencies or privately owned monopolies operated in most countries under close state regulation. But today there are many private players in most regions of the world, and even most of the government-owned companies have been opened up to competition in-line with World Trade Organization (WTO) policy agenda. Historically, these government agencies were often referred to, primarily in Europe, as PTTs (postal, telegraph and telephone services). Telecommunications companies are common carriers, and in the United States are also known as local exchange carriers. With the advent of mobile telephony, telecommunications companies now include wireless carriers, or mobile network operators and even satellite providers (Iridium).

Over time software companies have also evolved to provide telephone services over the Internet.

== Services ==
The telecommunications service provider has the responsibility for the acceptance, transmission, and delivery of messages. The telecommunications service user is responsible for the information content of the message.

For purposes of regulation by the Federal Communications Commission under the U.S. Communications Act of 1934 and Telecommunications Act of 1996, the definition of telecommunications service is "the offering of telecommunications for a fee directly to the public, or to such classes of users as to be effectively available directly to the public, regardless of the facilities used." Telecommunications, in turn, is defined as "the transmission, between or among points specified by the user, of information of the user’s choosing, without change in the form or content of the information as sent and received."

== History ==
In 1913, the Kingsbury Commitment allowed more than 20,000 independent telecommunications companies in the United States to use the long distance trunks of Bell Telephone Company.

== Popular culture ==
- Comedian Lily Tomlin frequently satirized the telephone industry (and the country's then-dominant Bell System in particular) with a skit playing the telephone operator Ernestine. Ernestine, who became one of Tomlin's trademark characters, was perhaps most famous for the following line: "We don't care; we don't have to. We're the phone company."
- In the satirical 1967 film The President's Analyst, The Phone Company (TPC) is depicted as plotting to enslave humanity by replacing landlines with brain-implanted mobile phones.
- In the 1988 video game Zak McKracken and the Alien Mindbenders, The Phone Company (TPC) was used by the Caponian aliens to secretly reduce the intelligence of humans.

== See also ==
- Bell Telephone Company, forerunner of AT&T in the U.S.
- Internet telephony service provider
- Competitive local exchange carrier (in Canada and the U.S.)
- Communications service provider
- History of the telephone
- Incumbent local exchange carrier (of the Bell System)
- Individual communication services and tariffs
- Intelligent network service (IN service)
- Internet service provider (ISP)
- List of telephone operating companies
- List of mobile network operators
- Mobile network operator
- Plain old telephone service (POTS)
- Public switched telephone network
- Telecommunications Industry Association (for the development of U.S. telecom standards)
- Regional Bell Operating Company (in the U.S.)
- Service provider
- Service layer
- Value-added service or content provider

== References and notes ==
Notes

Citations

Bibliography

- Huurdeman, Anton A. The Worldwide History Of Telecommunications, Wiley-IEEE, 2003, ISBN 0-471-20505-2, ISBN 978-0-471-20505-0
