= 1972 Men of the Midlands =

Professional invitational snooker tournament

Tournament information
- Dates: 3 January – 20 March 1972
- Venue: various
- Country: England
- Format: Non-ranking event
- Total prize fund: £1,000
- Winner's share: £300

Final
- Champion: Alex Higgins (NIR)
- Runner-up: John Spencer (ENG)
- Score: 4–2

The 1972 Men of the Midlands was a professional invitational snooker tournament, that took place from 3 January to 20 March 1972. The tournament was won by Alex Higgins, who defeated John Spencer 4–2 in the final.

The competition featured a round-robin group stage, with four players progressing into the semi-finals. Higgins won 4–0 against Ray Reardon in one semi final, and Spencer defeated Graham Miles 4–0 in the other.

Higgins won the first frame of the final, after Spencer missed an easy pink, and Spencer won the second frame. In the third, Higgins made breaks of 37 and 28 to win. The fourth frame saw both players miss changes to win, with Higgins eventually taking it with a break of 48. Spencer compiled a 58 break in winning the fifth frame, before Higgins won the sixth, with breaks of 24, 20 and 27, to win the match 4–2.

The tournament was sponsored by Mitchells and Butlers, who provided a prize fund of £1,000. Higgins received £300 as winner, and Spencer took £225 as runner-up.

== Round-robin ==
The players were divided into two groups, each of four players.

Date	Player	Score	Player	Venue	Ref.
3 January	John Spencer (ENG)	4–1	John Pulman (ENG)	Austin British Legion	
10 January	Jackie Rea (NIR)	4–3	Graham Miles (ENG)	North Walsall Working Men's Club	
17 January	David Taylor (ENG)	4–2	Geoff Thompson (ENG)	Redditch Liberal Club	
20 January	Ray Reardon (WAL)	4–0	David Taylor (ENG)	Standard Triumph Club, Coventry	
24 January	John Spencer (ENG)	4–2	Jackie Rea (NIR)	Parkinson Cowan	
25 January	John Spencer (ENG)	4–3	Graham Miles (ENG)	Wilenhall Social, Coventry	
31 January	Alex Higgins (NIR)	4–1	David Taylor (ENG)	Hinckley Liberal Club	
1 February	Graham Miles (ENG)	w.o.	John Pulman (ENG)	Whitmore Reans Conservative Club, Wolverhampton	
3 February	Jackie Rea (NIR)	w.o.	John Pulman (ENG)	Stewarts and Lloyds Club, Corby	
7 February	Geoff Thompson (ENG)	4–1	Ray Reardon (WAL)	Saffron Lane Working Men's Club	
9 February	Alex Higgins (NIR)	4–1	Ray Reardon (WAL)	Quarry Bank Labour Club	
14 February	Alex Higgins (NIR)	4–0	Geoff Thompson (ENG)	Lower Gornal Miners' Welfare	

Playoff

Due to "confusion over dates", Pulman was unable to play his scheduled matches against Miles and Rea. They faced each other in two playoff matches, which Miles won to progress to the semi-finals.

Date	Player	Score	Player	Venue	Ref.
unknown	Graham Miles (ENG)	4–1	Jackie Rea (NIR)	Whitmore Reans Conservative Club, Wolverhampton	
unknown	Graham Miles (ENG)	4–3	Jackie Rea (NIR)	British Steel, Corby	

== Knockout results ==
The match between Spencer and Miles was staged at Longbridge Social Club, and Higgins played Reardon at British Steel, Halesowen. The final was at Smethwick Working Men's Club.

Semi-finals; Best-of-seven frames
Alex Higgins (NIR)	4
Ray Reardon (WAL)	1
John Spencer (ENG)	4
Graham Miles (ENG)	0

Final; Best-of-seven frames
Alex Higgins (NIR)	4
John Spencer (ENG)	2
