= Minolta 35 =

35mm rangefinder camera

Minolta-35 from 1947
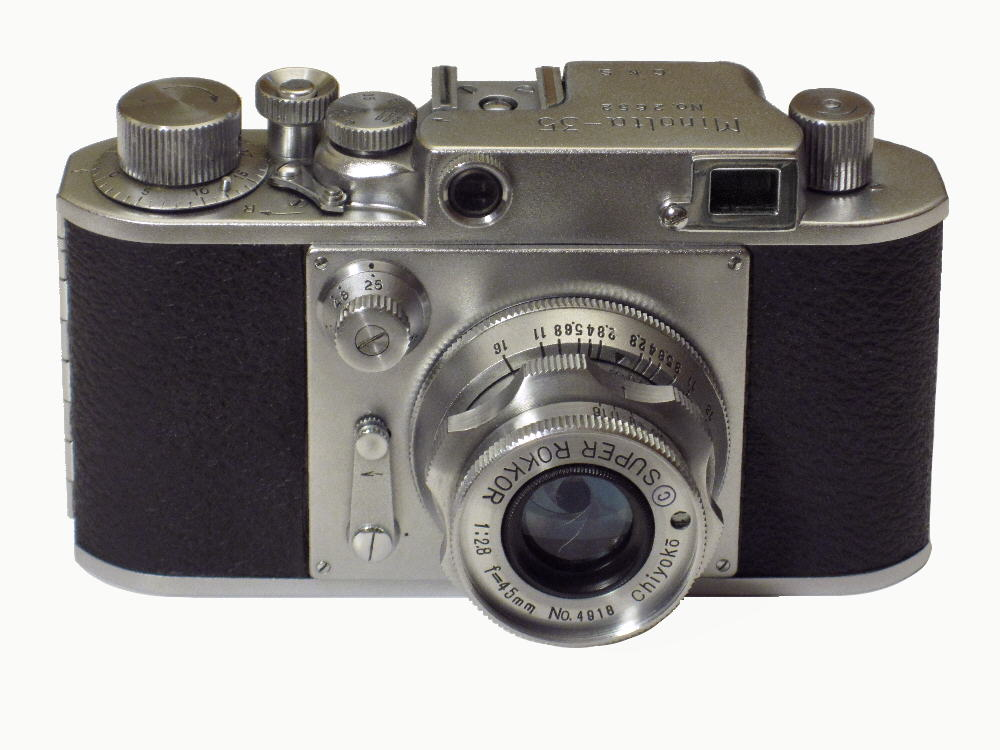

Overview
- Type: 35mm rangefinder camera

Lens
- Lens mount: 39mm thread

Exposure/metering
- Exposure: 24×32mm

The Minolta-35 was launched in the spring of 1947 by Chiyoda Kogaku. It was the first successful new 35mm rangefinder camera with Leica specifications to emerge on the market after World War II that uses the 39mm screw lens-mount. The Minolta-35 range of cameras was manufactured in quantities during its twelve-year production period, totalling about 40,000 units. Only the 1933 FED and the 1940 Leotax cameras had appeared successfully before it, although several Leica copies had appeared in both Italy and Japan.

== Models ==
There are eight successive models of the Minolta-35.

1 - Minolta-35 (Model A) On entering the miniature camera business, Chiyoda Kogaku had decided to make the frame size 24×32mm, a logical proposition at the time since most photo copies were made on paper closer to this format. The already established international standard was 36 images of 24×36mm. By doing so, a standard length of film yielded four more exposures on a 36-exposure load. The Minolta-35 has a combined viewfinder and rangefinder eyepiece, negating the need to move the sight from one window to the other. It also features a self-timer and a hinged rear door to facilitate film loading. The camera came with a decent Super Rokkor 45mm f/2.8 standard optic comprising five elements in three groups, including the front group of three cemented elements designed to secure sharp images on the small negative. When the camera appeared all engravings on the lens and on the slow-speed dial were oriented to be read from the front side of the camera. Later, at about serial no. 4000, they were turned to be read as one holds the camera for picture taking. Accessory mounted in the shoe on top of the camera is secured by a spring-loaded ball that sometimes mistakenly is assumed to be a flash synchroniser contact, which it is not.

2 - Minolta-35 (Model B) Already after a few months production successive modifications were introduced, both internally and on the outside. The first one, at about serial no.600, the engraving sequence on the long time dial was changed from 1-2-5-10-25 to 1-2-4-8-25. At about serial number 1500 the inscription at the top of the camera was simplified from the full company name, Chiyoda-Kogaku Osaka, to the initials C.K.S. for Chiyoda Kogaku Seiko.

Some cameras featured a blue © as part of the lens designation like in "© Rokkor". It was used to indicate a coated optics rather than a copyright.

3 – Minolta-35 (Model C) At about serial number 4000 the frame size was increased to 33mm length. It would gradually increase until finally, in 1953, it reach the full 36mm length when it was realised that it was impossible to obtain acceptance for the shorter format for export, since automatic cutting and mounting machines for colour slides would destroy three out of four slides. In addition, the rewind release lever was increased somewhat in size. The engravings on the lens and on the slow speed dial were turned to be read as one holds the camera for picture taking!

4 – Minolta-35 (Model D) In 1949 at about serial no.10,000, a recess was introduced under the lens-mount to improve operating the lens focusing lever, and the rewind release lever was moved, placed under the frame counter. By now the film frame length has been increased to 34mm, and carrying strap eyelets has been added at either end of the camera body.

5 – Minolta-35 Model E From late 1951 at about serial number 15,000, the camera model designation was engraved on the camera front in the upper right corner of the lens mount plate, starting at model E. At this stage, a mechanical flash synchronization receptacle was provided at the back just below the accessory shoe. The viewfinder now has an eyesight adjustment, accomplished by rotating the eyepiece bezel.

6 – Minolta-35 Model F A year later at about serial number 17,000, the flash synchronization became available using a standard coaxial PC socket.

7 – Minolta-35 Model II Introduced in 1953, and the frame format remains at 24 x 34mm. During the production run several changes were made, allowing for a second version possibly introduced about serial number 70,000: The most notable feature is the deeper drawn top and base cover plates. In addition, the full company name is reintroduced: CHIYODA KOGAKU. A red X between 8 and 25 at the slow speed dial indicates the proper flash synchronising shutter speed. After two years run in the summer of 1955, two new 50mm standard lenses in modernised barrels became available; the Super Rokkor 1:2 50mm and the 1:2.8 50mm.

8 – Minolta-35 Model IIB Finally, the last model was introduced in May 1958 at about serial number 103,000, now engraved under the company name at the top. The notable new features are the lever wind with the frame counter in its hub, and the rewind release lever moved away from it and it is much smaller. This retained the same Minolta-35's substandard 24 x 34mm format, with wider spaces between frames to yield the same number of frames as declared by the film packaging.. The standard lens on this model is the black finished Super Rokkor 1:1.8 50mm. Production ended a year later in preference of the new area of 35mm SLR cameras well on their way with the Minolta SR-2 and its successors.
