= Men of the Midlands =

Tournament information
- Location: Various
- Country: England
- Established: 1972
- Organisation(s): WPBSA
- Format: Invitational event
- Final year: 1973
- Final champion: (Northern Ireland) Alex Higgins

The Men of the Midlands was a professional invitational snooker tournament held for two editions in various locations around England in 1972 and 1973. Both tournaments were won by Alex Higgins.

The 1972 edition featured eight players in two groups each playing the other once with the top two in each group progressing to the semi-finals. In the 1973 edition there were four players who played each other twice. The top two then met in the final.

== Winners ==
Year	Winner	Runner-up	Final score	Season
1972	(Northern Ireland) Alex Higgins	(England) John Spencer	4–2	1971/72
1973	(Northern Ireland) Alex Higgins	(Wales) Ray Reardon	5–3	1972/73
