= Kenneth Corfield =

British camera engineer (1924–2016)

- Born: 27 January 1924; Rushall, England
- Died: 11 January 2016 (aged 91)

Sir Kenneth George Corfield (27 January 1924 – 11 January 2016) was a British camera engineer and industrialist.

Born in Rushall near Walsall, Corfield attended the South Staffordshire College of Advanced Technology and worked in management development in ICI's Metals division from 1946 until 1950, when with his brother John he established K. G. Corfield Ltd in Wolverhampton. The company first made accessories for photographers, then launched the Periflex camera in 1953; it also imported Exacta Varex and Minox cameras from East Germany.

After a majority holding in the company was bought by Guinness in the early 1960s, he led the expansion of Parkinson Cowan, a maker of gas meters and gas appliances. In 1966 he moved to American company ITT, becoming managing director of their British subsidiary Standard Telephones and Cables in 1969 and then executive chairman from 1979. Here he followed an ambitious expansion strategy, including in 1984 the ill-fated acquisition of computer maker ICL, leading to his resignation the following year.

Corfield was also involved in developing the Architect camera and, in partnership with Brian Gould, he purchased the Gandolfi company in 1982 to ensure its future. He was the chair of the Science Museum committee which in 1982 selected Bradford as the home for the National Museum of Photography, Film & Television, later the National Media Museum.

In 1982 he received an Honorary Doctorate from the University of Bath.

Corfield was knighted in 1980. He died at the age of 91 on 11 January 2016.
