= 1973 Men of the Midlands =

Professional invitational snooker tournament

Tournament information
- Dates: January – February 1973
- Venue: various
- Country: England
- Format: Non-ranking event
- Winner's share: £500

Final
- Champion: Alex Higgins (NIR)
- Runner-up: Ray Reardon (WAL)
- Score: 5–3

The 1973 Men of the Midlands was a professional invitational snooker tournament, that took place in January and February 1973 The tournament was won by Alex Higgins, who defeated Ray Reardon 5–3 in the final.

The competition featured a round-robin group stage, with four world snooker champions, John Pulman, John Spencer, Reardon and Higgins each playing the other three once. Reardon finished on top of the group table.

In the final, Higgins won the first frame, making a break of 47, and Reardon won the next making a break of 45. Higgins won the next to lead 3–1. Reardon won the fifth frame, but Higgins achieved victory by winning the sixth frame with a break of 70 and going on to take the match 5–3.

The tournament was sponsored by Mitchells and Butlers. Higgins earned £500 prize money as champion.

== Final ==
Final: Best-of-9 frames. Whispering Wheels Club, Wolverhampton, 5 February 1973
| Alex Higgins (Northern Ireland) | | | 5–3 | Ray Reardon (Wales) | | | | |
| Frame | 1 | 2 | 3 | 4 | 5 | 6 | 7 | 8 |
| Alex Higgins | 75 | 56 | 75 | 82 | 31 | 82 | 49 | 86 |
| Ray Reardon | 5 | 58 | 48 | 38 | 77 | 39 | 72 | 52 |
| Frames won (Higgins first) | 1–0 | 1–1 | 2–1 | 3–1 | 3–2 | 4–2 | 4–3 | 5–3 |
Alex Higgins wins the 1973 Men of the Midlands title
