= Triple play (telecommunications) =

Bundling of television, internet, and telephone service

Diagram showing connectivity for triple play customers over xDSL and CATV networks

In telecommunications, triple play refers to the provision of broadband internet, television, and telephony over a single connection. The concept highlights the supplier convergence of multiple services with the aim of improving convenience for users and streamlining service delivery.

== CATV ==
By around 2000, cable TV companies were technically able to offer triple play over a single physical medium to a large portion of their customers, as their networks already had sufficient bandwidth to carry hundreds of video channels. In North America, cable's main competition for television came from satellite TV, which could not compete effectively for voice and interactive broadband services due to the latency inherent in geosynchronous satellite transmission—sometimes resulting in delays of up to one second between speaking and being heard. For voice and Internet access, cable's main competition came from telephone companies, which at that time were generally unable to compete for television services because DSL over most local loops did not provide sufficient bandwidth.

As an interim marketing strategy while deploying fiber closer to customers, telephone companies such as AT&T, Verizon, and Xfinity entered into co-promotion agreements with satellite TV providers. These arrangements enabled them to sell bundled packages of television, telephone, and Internet access for billing purposes, even though the satellite and telephone services were technically independent. Telephone companies that also operated wireless networks often included mobile services in such billing bundles, as most cable companies did not own wireless infrastructure.

== Deployments ==
The first triple play deployment was carried out by the U.S. operator Cox Communications in 1997. It was delivered via a Hybrid fiber-coaxial network using digital and analogue television set-top boxes, digital telephony devices from Arris International, and a cable modem system from Motorola.

In the United States, triple play services are offered by both cable television and telecommunication operators, who compete directly with one another. Providers anticipate that integrated service packages increase switching costs for customers considering alternative providers, enable greater opportunities for cross-selling, and delay competition from power companies deploying G.hn and IEEE P1901 technologies, which are often regarded as having more efficient service and deployment characteristics.

Outside the United States, power companies have in some cases been more successful in bypassing legacy technologies, particularly in countries such as Ecuador, Pakistan, India, Japan, and China. In Switzerland and Sweden, dark fiber is widely available to homes at regulated rates (in Switzerland, four dark fibre lines are deployed to each household), supporting speeds exceeding 40 Gbit/s to local caches. However, backhaul capacity often remains limited, with typical connections to global services capped at around 10 Mbit/s.

Since 2007, access providers in Italy have participated in the Fiber for Italy initiative, which aims to build infrastructure capable of delivering 100 Mbit/s symmetrical bandwidth to consumers to support the provision of triple- and quadruple play services. Quadruple play extends the concept by including mobile services alongside broadband Internet, television, and fixed-line telephony.

Other notable triple-play deployments have been made by Deutsche Telekom, VMedia, Telecom Italia, Swisscom, Telekom Austria, Telus, Telkom Indonesia, and PLDT.

== Regulation ==
Triple-play services have been the subject of significant regulatory disputes, as incumbent telephone companies and cable operators have sought to limit new competition. Because both industries historically operated as regulated monopolies, regulatory capture has played a central role alongside pricing and service terms. Cable providers have generally sought to compete with telephone companies in the provision of local voice services, while resisting competition from them in television markets. Conversely, incumbent telephone companies have pursued entry into the television market but sought to restrict competition from cable providers in voice services. Both industries have framed their positions as serving the public interest.

In March 2007, cable operators achieved a notable victory when the Federal Communications Commission (FCC) ruled that incumbent local exchange carriers must connect to VoIP services, overruling decisions by state public service commissions in South Carolina and Nebraska that had allowed local telephone companies to block Time Warner Cable from offering phone service in their states.

Also in March 2007, the FCC restricted the powers of municipalities and states over telephone companies seeking to compete with cable television providers. Consumer groups criticised the ruling, expressing concern that telephone companies would only extend services to affluent neighbourhoods. Local governments typically require "build-out" and community access provisions obligating cable providers to extend service to entire municipalities within a defined timeframe. All three Republican members of the FCC voted in favour of the ruling, while both Democratic members voted against it; one commissioner predicted that either Congress or the courts would overturn the decision.

In October 2007, the Hartford Courant reported that Connecticut regulators ordered AT&T to stop enrolling new customers for its IPTV service until the company obtained a cable licence. AT&T announced its intention to challenge the ruling in court.

== Telco ==
For telephone local exchange carriers (LECs), triple play is typically delivered using a combination of optical fiber and digital subscriber line (DSL) technologies, often referred to as fiber in the loop. In this arrangement, fiber is used to cover longer distances, while DSL is deployed over existing POTS twisted pair cables to provide last mile access to subscribers. Cable television operators use a similar architecture, known as hybrid fibre-coaxial (HFC), which employs coaxial cable rather than twisted pair for the last-mile connection. Subscribers may be located in residential homes, multi-dwelling units (MDUs), or business offices.

With DSL over twisted pair, television content is delivered through IPTV, streamed in an MPEG-2 transport format. On HFC networks, television may include a mix of analogue and digital television signals. A set-top box (STB) at the subscriber's premises enables channel selection and additional services such as video on demand. Internet access is typically provided through Asynchronous Transfer Mode or DOCSIS, delivered to the subscriber via an Ethernet port. Voice service may be provided either as a traditional POTS interface integrated with the legacy telephone network, or via voice over IP (VoIP). On HFC networks, voice is usually delivered using VoIP.

Some service providers have also introduced Ethernet to the home and fiber to the home (FTTH) networks, which support triple-play services while avoiding the limitations of adapting broadband to legacy infrastructure. This approach is particularly common in greenfield developments, where a single integrated network reduces capital expenditure.

In existing multi-dwelling-unit (MDU) buildings, where running fiber to each unit may be impractical, operators often deploy VDSL to connect individual units over existing copper wiring, with a central optical network terminal located in the building's telecommunications room. Because of the short transmission distances involved, VDSL can deliver much higher bitrates than conventional DSL over longer local loops from a central office.

== Business ==
The challenges in offering triple play services are primarily related to business models, backend processes, customer support, and the broader economic environment, rather than technological limitations. Factors such as selecting an appropriate billing platform to accommodate diverse subscriber demographics, or achieving sufficient subscriber density to justify the financial investment, influence decisions on whether to introduce triple-play services.

== See also ==
- Quadruple play, also integrating mobility
- IPTV
- Technological convergence
- Telecommunication convergence
- Voice over IP
