= Heartland Town Centre =

Shopping centre in Ontario, Canada

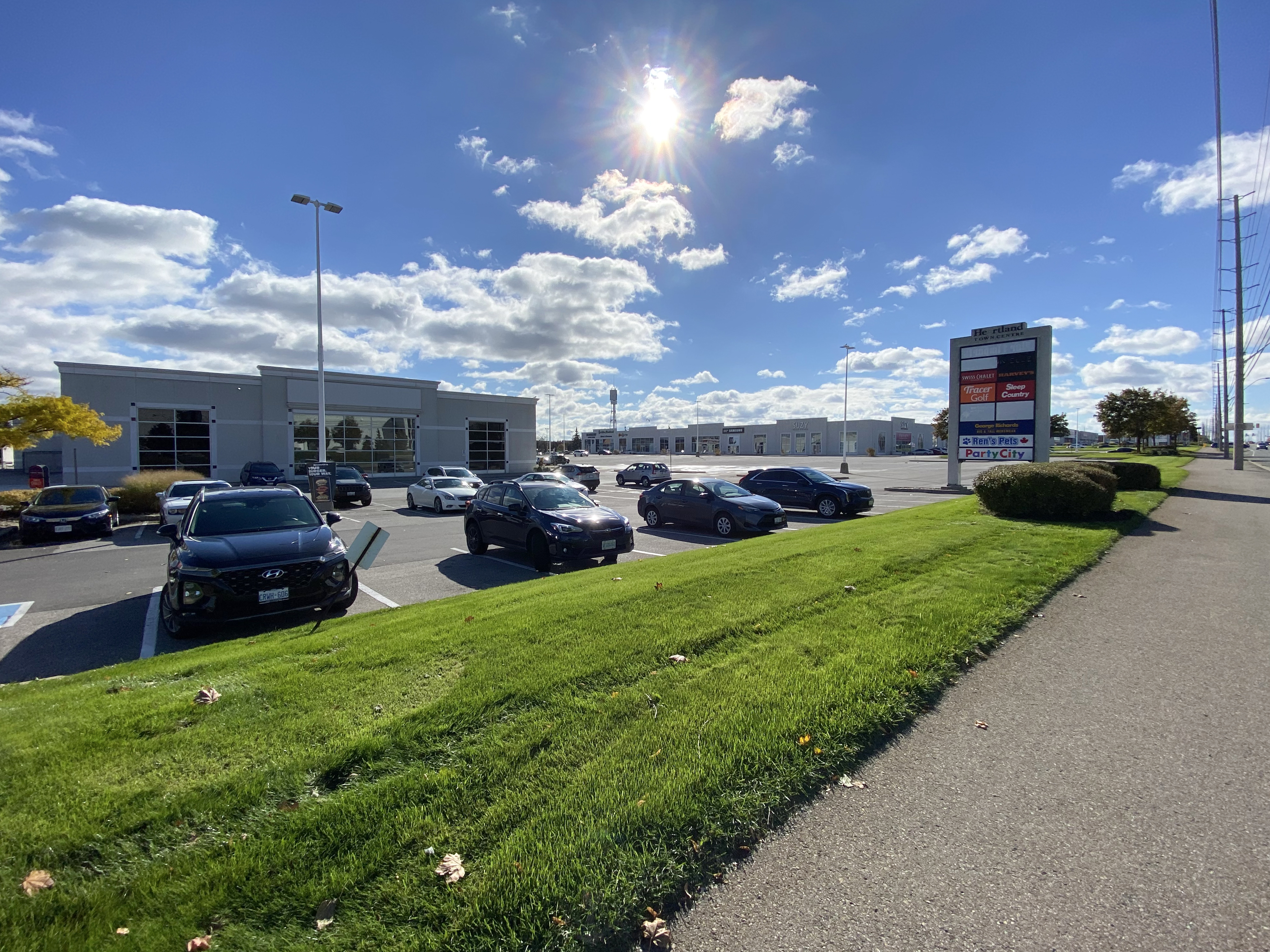
- Heartland Town Centre in 2021
- Location: Mississauga, Ontario, Canada
- Coordinates: 43.6144°N 79.6940°W
- Owner: Orlando Corporation
- Num. of stores: 180
- Floor area: 2,200,000 square feet (200,000 m^{2})
- Website: www.heartlandtown.com

Heartland Town Centre is a collective grouping of outdoor shopping centres located in Mississauga, Ontario, Canada. Heartland Town Centre occupies 2,200,000 square feet (200,000 m^{2}) of space and has 180 stores, making it one of Canada's largest power centres.

Heartland Town Centre is owned and managed by Canadian-based Orlando Corporation. The centre's slogan is "It's all here".

== Location ==
The Heartland Town Centre is centred on the Mavis and Britannia Roads intersection, covering all four corners, reaching north to Boyer Boulevard, south to Matheson Boulevard, west to Terry Fox / Silken Laumann Ways, and east to McLaughlin Road. Nearby population centres include Brampton, Toronto, and Oakville.

== Description ==
Heartland Town Centre offers a variety of retailers, services and restaurants. The major stores are spread around two blocks and have independent buildings and parking lots. Retailers include Sephora, JD Sports, American Eagle, Malabar Gold and Diamonds, Ashley HomeStore, Best Buy, Banana Republic, Costco, Dollarama, H&M, HomeSense, JYSK, Harry Rosen Outlet, Loblaws, Marshalls, Michaels, Moores, Old Navy, Party City, PetSmart, The Brick, Seafood City, Staples, Tommy Hilfiger, Uniqlo, Walmart and Winners.
