= Seafood City =

American supermarket chain that caters to Filipinos

Seafood City Supermarket
- Type: Private
- Industry: Retail, Supermarkets, Grocery, Food court
- Founded: 1989 (37 years ago) in National City, California, U.S.
- Headquarters: Pomona, California
- Number of locations: 37 (as of 2025)
- Area served: United States; Arizona; California; Hawaii; Illinois; Nevada; Texas; Washington; Canada; Alberta; Manitoba; Ontario
- Products: Filipino products
- Website: http://www.seafoodcity.com/

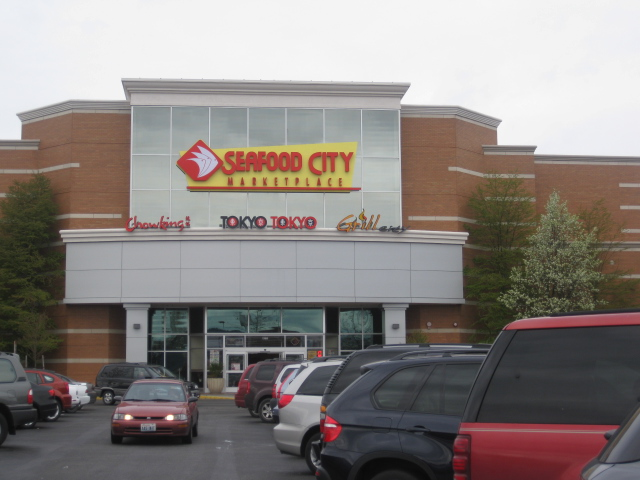
Seattle branch

Seafood City is an American supermarket chain that specializes in Filipino food and products. It was founded in National City, California, as Manila Seafood and is headquartered in Pomona, California. It currently operates 39 stores across North America.

Seafood City opened its first store in National City, California, in 1989. It has since expanded to 21 stores in California, with a concentration in Greater Los Angeles, San Diego County, and Northern California. Further expansion has led the company to open markets in the Las Vegas, Nevada, area, Seattle (Tukwila, Washington), Chicago, Illinois, and Waipahu, Hawaii.

== Canadian stores and US expansion plans ==
Seafood City has expanded into Canada by opening its first location in Mississauga, Ontario, in the Heartland Town Centre shopping district in the fall of 2017. Additional stores followed in Winnipeg in 2019, Edmonton and Calgary in 2020, and Scarborough, Ontario, in 2021.

Seafood City opened its first store in Texas in the city of Sugar Land, near Houston in December 2023. Later in 2026, the first Arizona branch opened in Chandler, Arizona. There are plans to expand to Florida; and Virginia in later years.

== See also ==
- Little Manila
- Asian supermarket
