= Richard Corfield (scientist) =

British science writer

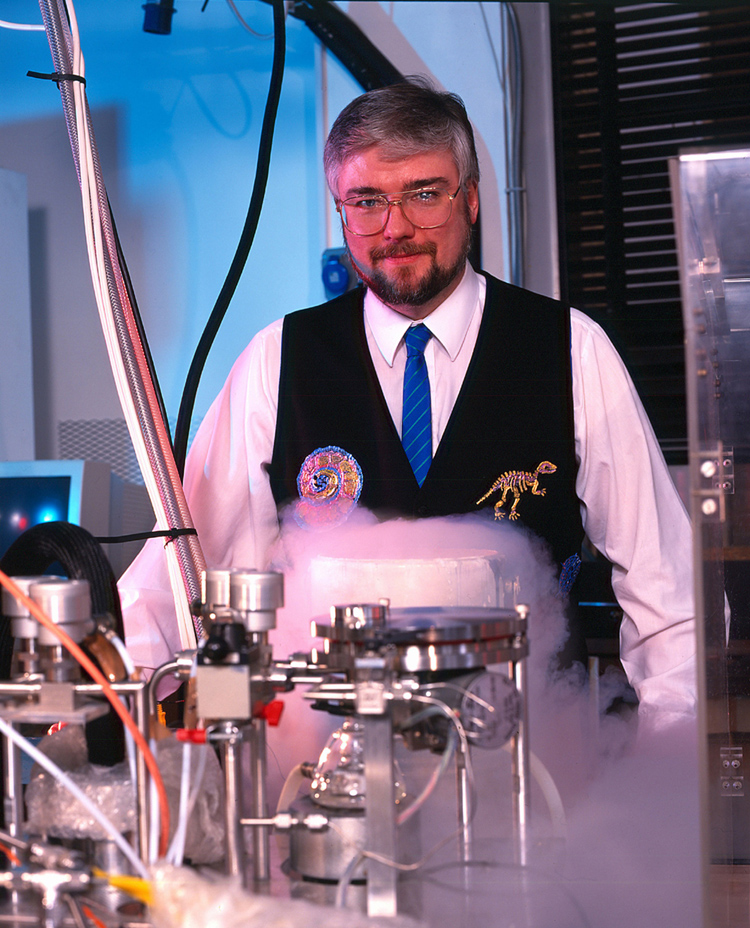
- Born: 22 January 1962 (age 64)

Richard Corfield (born 22 January 1962) is a scientist, science writer, and broadcaster, based in Oxford, United Kingdom.

== Early life ==
Corfield attended an all boys' grammar school, William Ellis School, in Highgate, London.

He received his BSc in Zoology in 1983 from Bristol University and his PhD in biogeochemistry in 1987 from Cambridge University, where he worked with Professor Sir Nicholas Shackleton FRS on the greenhouse effect during the Paleocene Epoch.

== Career ==
Corfield is the managing director of the Science and Media consultancy Hanborough Consultants. He has written three books: Architects of Eternity: The New Science of Fossils, The Silent Landscape: In the Wake of HMS Challenger, and Lives of the Planets; A Natural History of the Solar System.

As well as contributing to magazines, on-line publications and newspapers such as Physics World, Chemistry World, Astrobiology.net, Space.com, and The Washington Post he also wrote and appeared in the Newton Channel/Guardian documentary An Interview with Craig Venter.

He is also a regular contributor on radio, particularly to In Our Time with Melvyn Bragg, The Material World, and The Report.

== Personal life ==
Corfield lives in Long Hanborough, on the A4095, west of Oxford. He is married to Julie Cartlidge. They have two daughters, born in 1994 and 2000.
