= Joe Corfield =

Australian rules footballer

Personal information
- Full name: Joseph William Corfield
- Born: 8 March 1895; Fitzroy, Victoria
- Died: 7 November 1970 (aged 75)
- Original team: Geelong (VFA)
- Height: 177 cm (5 ft 10 in)
- Weight: 76 kg (168 lb)

Playing career^{1}
| Years | Club | Games (Goals) |
| 1926 | Richmond | 5 (0) |
- ^{1} Playing statistics correct to the end of 1926.

Joseph William Corfield (8 March 1895 – 7 November 1970) was an Australian rules footballer who played with Richmond in the Victorian Football League (VFL).
