= Parkinson Cowan =

British home appliance brand

- Type: Ltd.
- Industry: Engineering
- Founded: 1902
- Founder: Unknown
- Defunct: 1971
- Headquarters: Unknown, England
- Products: Gas metering equipment, stoves and appliances
- Website: Official website

Parkinson Cowan was a British manufacturer of gas meters and gas stoves between 1900 and 1971. The name is now used for a brand of cooking appliances, owned by the Electrolux group.

== History ==
- 1900: The company is formed by the amalgamation of W. Parkinson Ltd, founded by William Parkinson of London and Birmingham, and W. and B. Cowan Ltd of London, Manchester, Edinburgh and New South Wales. The new enterprise is known as Parkinson and W. and B. Cowan.
- 1919: The company opens a new factory at Stretford, Manchester to manufacture gas meters.
- 1928 The company is renamed Parkinson and Cowan. Henry Cowan, Unionist member of parliament, is chairman around this time.
- 1937: Parkinson and Cowan (Gas Meters) Ltd is a listed exhibitor at the British Industries Fair.
- 1939: The company, like many other engineering concerns of the period, becomes an aircraft industry supplier.
- c.1960 to 1966: Kenneth Corfield is chairman.
- 1971: The company is taken over by Thorn, becoming part of Thorn Gas Appliances and continuing to make gas meters.
- 1987: Electrolux purchases the white goods division of Thorn-EMI, including the Parkinson Cowan brand.
- 1989: Gas metering operations, now under the banner of Thorn EMI Gas Metering (formerly Thorn EMI Flow Measurement), are sold to Schlumberger (later Actaris, now Itron)
- 1991: Sales, marketing and logistics functions of the Parkinson Cowan appliance business relocate to the former Coca-Cola distribution facility in Minworth, Birmingham. Moffat sub-brand of built-in appliances re-launched.
- 1993: Closure of the Minworth site.
- 1995: Production of gas cookers ceases at the Stechford, Birmingham factory. Gas cooking appliances marketed under the Parkinson Cowan brand are made at the Electrolux cooker factory in Spennymoor, County Durham.
- 2008: Electrolux close the site at Spennymoor and move production to Poland.

The name Parkinson Cowan still exists in the UK as a brand of gas stoves, one of the company's early products.

== Cultural references ==
The English Post-punk band 'Empire' wrote a song about a cooker entitled Parkinson Cowan, which was commercially released on their long-player entitled Expensive Sound (2003).
