= Individual communication services and tariffs =

Individual communication services and tariffs is the regulatory protected ability for an identified user to obtain from a communication service provider, by a bilateral specific contract, a combination of the service and related content, at a specific price (called a tariff chosen by the user) corresponding to a user request specified with a service demand profile and some duration.

Individual service, is then the communication service supplied in the way stated above, with a request and specification by the user; Individual tariff, is then the price paid by the user for such an individual service.
