= Corfield Periflex =

Corfield Periflex 1
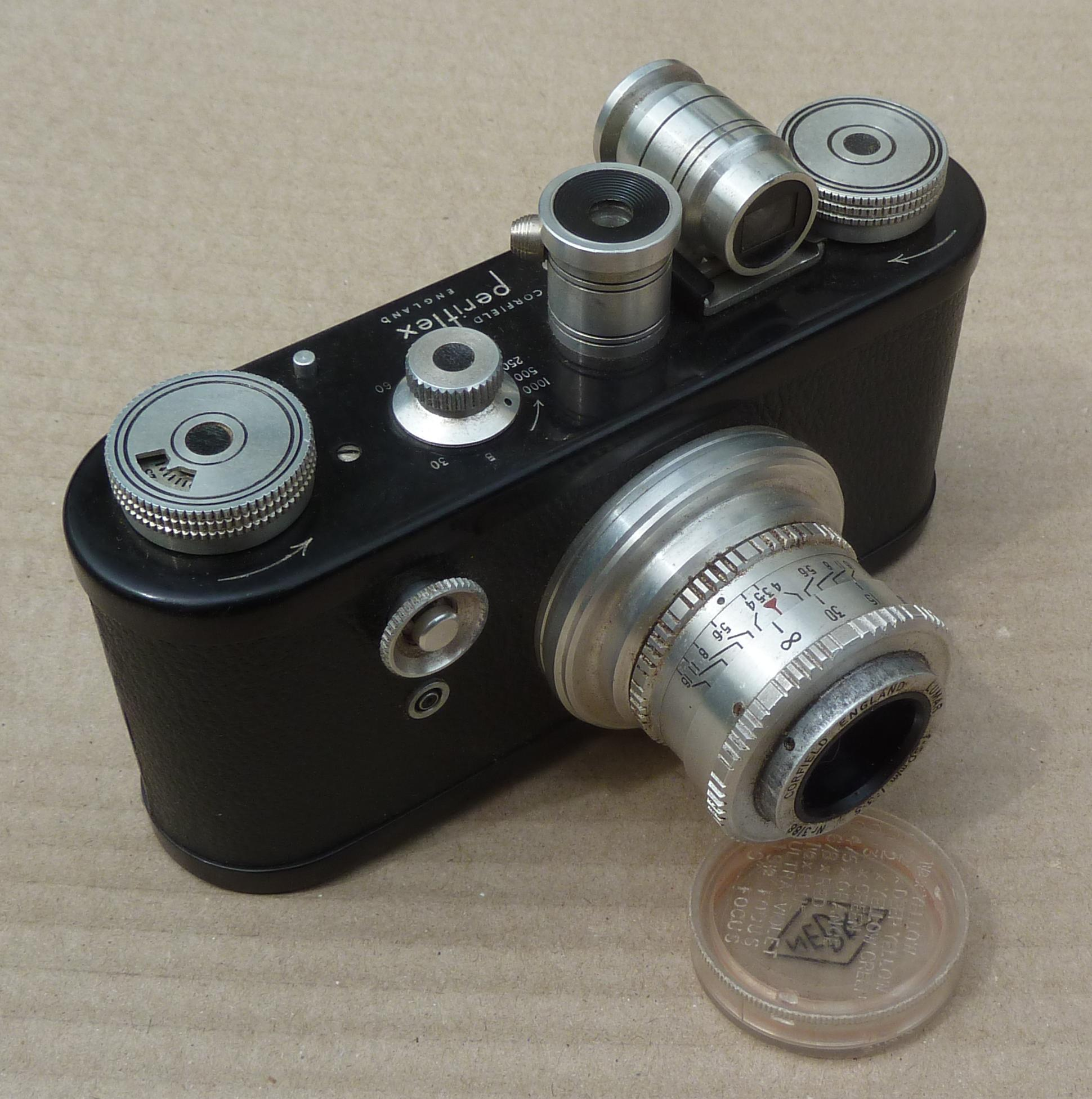
- 1953 Periflex 1 with black leathercloth

The Periflex 35mm camera range was launched by K. G. Corfield Ltd, England in May 1953 with the "Periflex 1" . Subsequent models used the same general form and layout with improvements to the viewfinder design and surface finishes. The camera resembles the Leica Standard and qualify as a Leica copy. However, film loading is by way of a removable back. Focusing is provided through the lens using an inverted periscope lowered into the light path between the lens and the film allowing a small section of the full image to be viewed. The Periflex became quite popular in Britain and several improved models were introduced until their demise in the early 1960s.

== Description ==
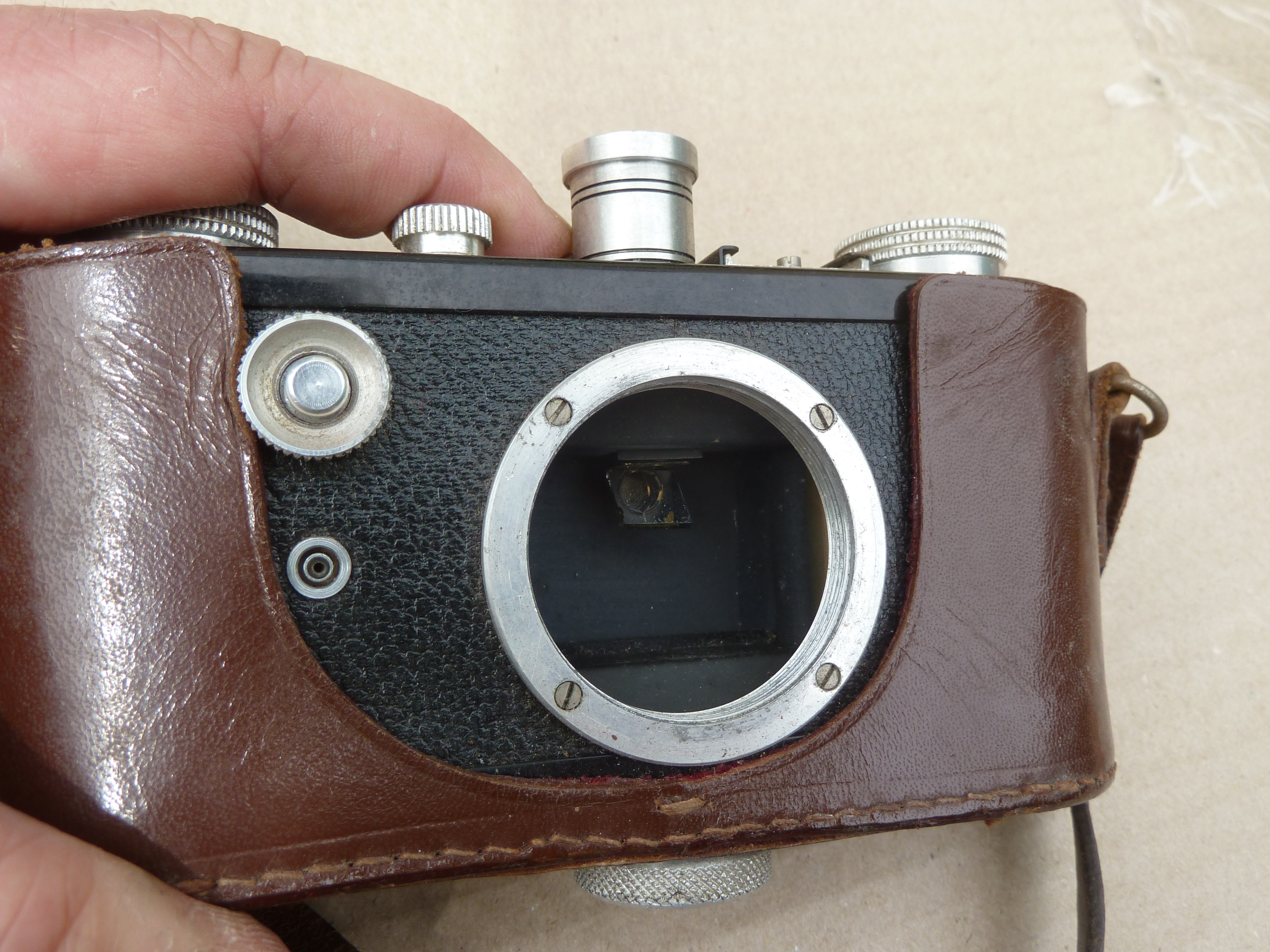
The periscope viewfinder in the lowered, working position

The body of the "periflex 1" is made of black painted metal alloy castings, while the top and base-plates are of black anodised stamped aluminium with delicate engravings. In later models the body covering material was brown pigskin, soon changed to black leather cloth because the pig skin stained easily. Also for this reason, whenever a camera was returned to the Wolverhampton works for service, the brown covering would be replaced without charge, if the owner so desired.

A semiautomatic decrementing frame-counter is built into the wind-on knob visible through a small cutaway window in the knob. A small button next to it, which also doubles as a film rewind release, allows the wind-on knob to be turned back and forth to set the frame counter to the number of frames remaining on the loaded film.

The optical viewfinder, with individual eyesight adjustment, is mounted in an accessory shoe slightly offset to the left-hand side on the top plate. It matches the field-of-view of the standard 50mm camera lens. It may be replaced by separately available ones matching the field of view of interchangeable lenses of the photographer's choice.

The built-in focusing aide is situated centrally on the top plate. It is lowered manually into the light pass behind the camera lens in the "Periflex 1" but in later models the fill wind-on mechanism also lowers the periscope.

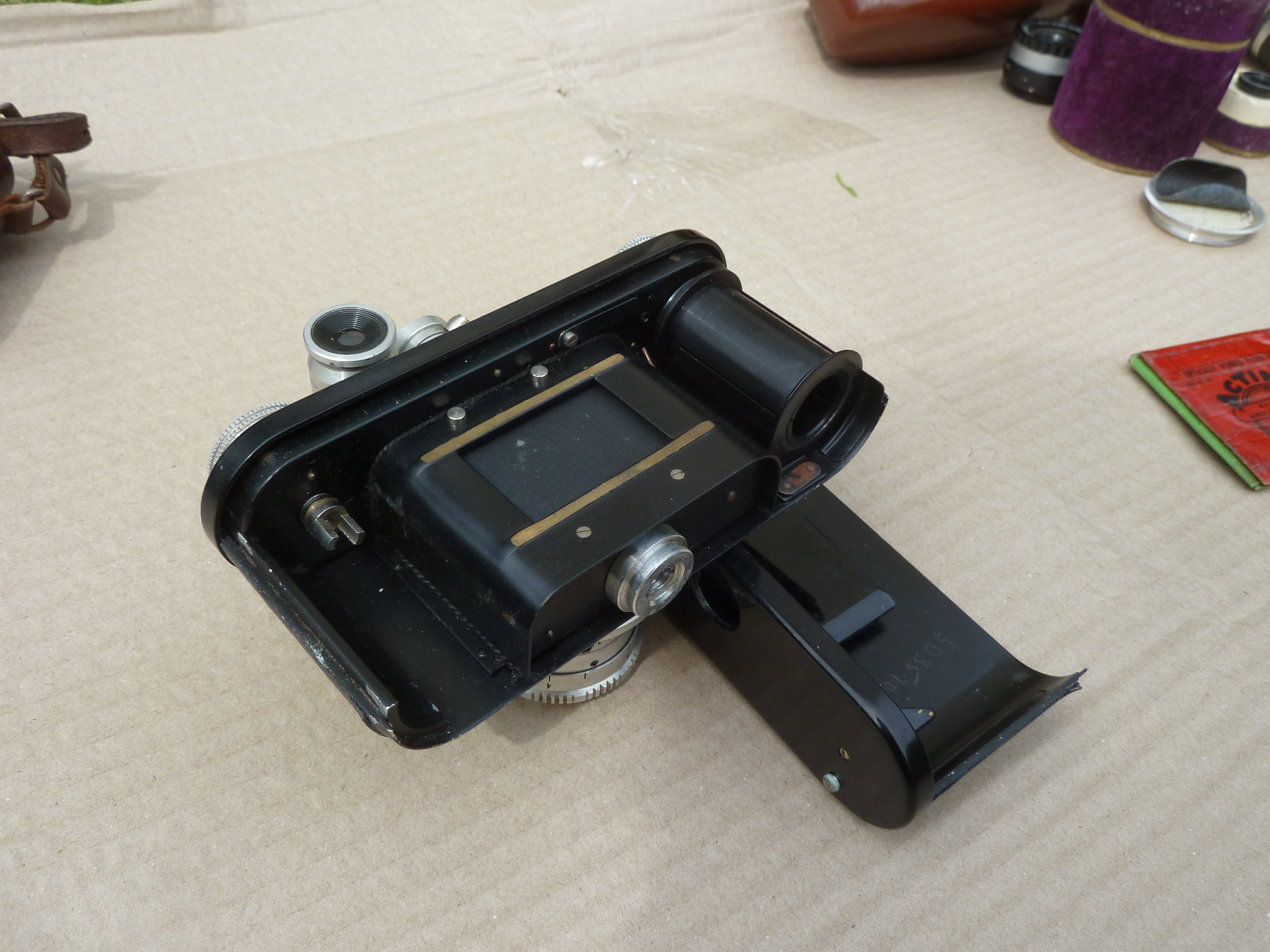
Back removed, showing the cloth focal plane shutter

The cloth focal-plane shutter provides speeds from 1/30 to 1/1000 sec. and B. The shutter release button is situated on the right-hand camera front externally threaded for Leica cable release. The shutter control is the small milled knob on the top with numerals from 30 to 1000 and B engraved around it. It serves dual purposes, for winding the shutter in a single anti-clockwise motion until a catch arrests it, and thence as a lift and turn type shutter speed selector. A standard coaxial flash synchronising socket is situated at the front of the camera, below the shutter release button.

The camera back is removable for changing film. A milled button next to the tripod socket rotates either way to lock the back, while in a position in between it is unlocked. The back comes off downwards as a single unit including the base-plate. The film-pressure plate of thick glass is mounted on a piece of rubber foam on the back. Inside the camera, on the left-hand side, is the 35mm film cassette chamber, and to the right is the counter clockwise rotating film take-up drum. It has a narrow slit for the film leader, and it rotates freely whenever the small film rewind button on the top plate is depressed. No sprocket wheel is employed; instead, the film is pulled by, and wound onto the drum that always rotates the same angular amount for next picture frame. Acceptable frame spacing is accomplished by the large diameter take-up spool that reduces the effect of increasing spool diameter as more film is wound onto it.

The Periflex was sold with a Corfield England Lumar f=50mm 1:3.5 standard lens in a bright aluminium barrel. Corfield had the British Optical Lens Company calculate the three element Cooke design, and subsequently became the manufacturer and supplier of the coated glass elements, while Corfield turned, cut and milled the barrels, and completed the lenses in their premises.

Some time after that the engraving of the top plate was dropped and instead an engraved disc was placed under the shutter speed dial. "Corfield / Periflex / England" was engraved on the front of the periscope housing. After about one and a half year of manufacture, the top and base plate finish were changed to bright anodised aluminium. All later standard models were finished in bright aluminium and black leather.

- 1st version - black body, brown pigskin cover, aluminium lens barrel
- 2nd version - black body, black leatherette cover, aluminium lens barrel
- 3rd version - black body, black leatherette cover, engravings moved to bright aluminium parts
- 4th version - chrome body, black leatherette cover, black leather strips on lens.

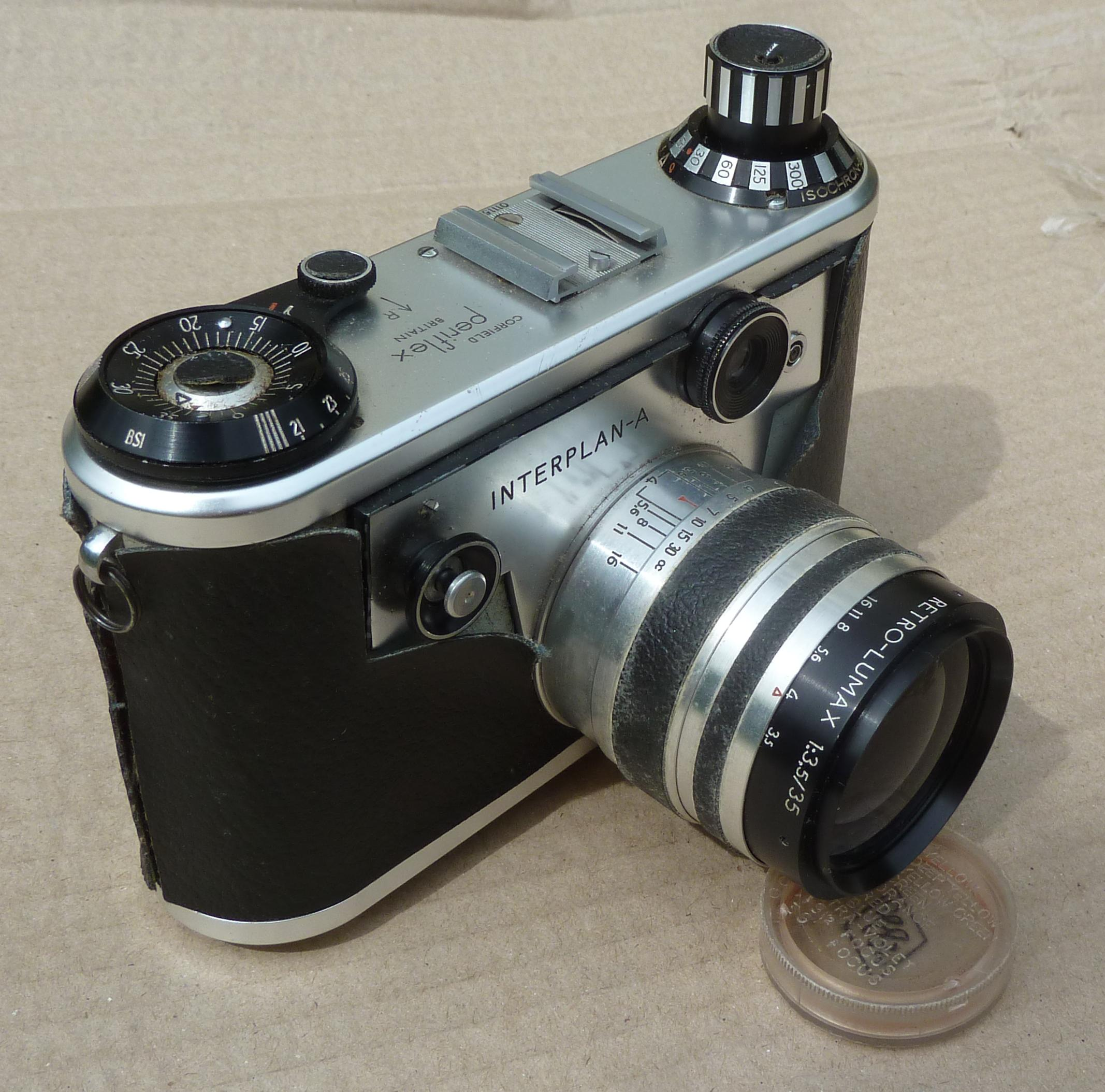
Later model Interplan-A

The Periflex was replaced by the largely reworked Periflex 3 in 1957, and a year later complemented by the economy model Periflex 2.
