= K. G. Corfield Ltd =

K. G. Corfield Ltd was an innovative camera and lens manufacturing company based in Wolverhampton. The company produced high quality cameras and lenses basing many design features on the Leica range of 35mm cameras. One unique design was employed in the Periflex series of cameras which utilised a novel periscope viewing system to achieve fine focus. A miniature periscope descended into the optical path of the lens when the film was advanced. This provided a much enlarged view of the central area of the film frame. When the shutter was released, the periscope sprung vertically up out of the optical path and then the horizontal cloth focal plane shutter operated.

The company also produced other photographic equipment including the Lumimeter, an exposure meter for use in the darkroom based on the comparison between reflected light from the enlarger and a variable transmitted light from the meter observed in a split screen. When both sides were equally lit, the dial controlling the variable light showed the correct exposure. The driving force behind the company and its products was Sir Kenneth Corfield

In January 1959, the camera manufacturer moved from Wolverhampton to Ballymoney, becoming the only camera manufacturers on the island of Ireland. In the face of face of Japanese and German competition, the enterprise failed. The company ceased trading in 1971 Subsequently, Sir Kenneth Corfield resurrected the firm to build the Architect camera and to become involved in the production of Gandolfi cameras.

== Products ==
- Periflex
- Periflex 2
- Periflex 3
- Goldstar
- Interplan
- Architect
- Lumimeter

== Distributors for ==
- Prestolite Electric alternators
- Shirley Wellard Universal Cassettes
