= Supplier convergence =

Business model

Supplier convergence is a business model in which a company offers a combination of services or products that were previously supplied by separate companies. It is not to be confused with product convergence, where one product combines and replaces several others; rather, supplier convergence happens primarily through mergers and acquisitions, or through the expansion of larger companies into areas previously dominated by specialty businesses.

== In retail ==
Supplier convergence in the retail industry is often described as the creation and growth of, literally, "one-stop shopping" (Slywotzky et al. 1999), epitomized by retail giants such as Wal-Mart, whose outlets offer a wide range of products in an attempt to make competing specialty stores obsolete. Essentially, each section in large department stores, such as hardware, electronics, and clothing, consequently aims to replace competing businesses specializing in just one of those areas.

While the above example deals with the combining of many different categories of products, supplier convergence can also occur with just one primary product. Examples of this trend would be the growth of book superstores such as Borders and Chapters, who have replaced many independent bookstores not by offering different products, but by offering a greater number of books that only several smaller stores combined could match.

== In the technology industry ==
The boom of technology and the internet in recent years has been a key factor behind the trend of supplier convergence. The bundling of products together is a prime example of how a telecom/entertainment company could exploit the convergence pattern to their advantage. By offering triple play discounts to customers who subscribe to a number of services such as land-line telephone, wireless phone, internet, and digital cable, companies are encouraging customers to receive all these services from a single company rather than several different ones. The expansion of wireless networks is also a factor in supplier convergence, as one national or international wireless phone company could replace many localized ones (InterTradeIsland 2002).

Websites provide another example of supplier convergence, often with regards to services rather than products. Mega-search sites such as Google and Yahoo have expanded from their humble beginnings as search engines to comprehensive information portals offering news, weather forecasts, and financial services. In doing so, they have created websites that replace or combine the services of many other specialized sites.

== Convergence pattern ==
A 2004 paper published by Microsoft explains what it calls the "convergence pattern" (Trowbridge et al. 2004); that is, the process that businesses must go through in order to achieve supplier convergence. The convergence pattern consists of three main steps:

1. "Successfully promote your product offerings"
2. "Emphasize the portions of the chain which command the highest perceived value"
3. "Upgrade your delivery of the lower value products"

== Benefits ==
Supplier convergence, when properly executed, can provide benefits to both companies and customers. The 2004 Microsoft paper by Trowbridge et al. singles out mergers and "bundling" as a particularly positive aspect of supplier convergence. By merging, it says, companies can increase their overall efficiency; that is "the cost of performing multiple business functions simultaneously should prove to be more efficient than performing each business function independently, and therefore drive down overall costs" (Trowbridge et al. 2004). This can also prove beneficial to the customers, as they can often receive a number of services and products at a better value from one company than from several smaller ones. The convergence of information suppliers, such as websites, also offers the public the ability to view and receive information from one source.

== Drawbacks ==
A key drawback to supplier convergence is that one of the main concepts of it is to force smaller companies into mergers or out of business by replacing or threatening to replace them with one large company offering different products or services. Wal-Mart and Borders, two of the superstores cited above, have received criticism for forcing local, independent stores out of business by offering convenience and prices that smaller retail stores would not be able to match. For many, this is a concerning trend, as it means local retail outlets will continue to be replaced with large, multinational firms.

A drawback to supplier convergence from a business's perspective can occur when a company applies convergence in such a way that makes it inconvenient for customers, and thus backfires on the company. For example, Belgian telecom company Belgacom decided in the late 1990s to combine fixed and mobile phone services into a single subscription. The plan failed, however, when customers wanted to keep these services separate and the company had technical difficulties in producing a single bill for two services (Shankar 2003).

== Supplier deconvergence ==
Although much more rare than supplier convergence, supplier deconvergence occurs when a company offering several services or products breaks into a number of smaller companies specializing in a specific service or product (InterTradeIreland 2002). This may occur as part of a restructuring process for companies, or may be a strategic decision to associate different companies with specific services or products.

== Similar types of convergence ==
As noted in the definition above, supplier convergence is not to be confused with product convergence, which occurs when two or more different products "evolve […] over time to the point where they overlap and address the same customer need" (Slywotzky et al. 1999). Supplier convergence does not reduce the number of products or services available, but merely the number of companies offering them.

Another type of convergence is known as complementor convergence. This takes place when two or more companies become allies or form strategic partnerships in order to drive out other competitors. This is not supplier convergence because they are not merging and forming a united line of products, but simply complementing each other with a business partnership (Slywotzky et al. 1999).
