= List of Minolta SR-mount cameras =

Minolta manufactured and marketed a line of 35mm film single lens reflex cameras (SLRs) and lenses with the Minolta SR-mount between 1958 and 1996; Minolta later introduced the Minolta A-mount system in 1985, a line of autofocus SLRs and lenses with the mechanically incompatible Minolta A-mount, which eventually supplanted the manual focus system.

== Overview ==
The first Minolta SLRs were marketed with SR- model numbers starting from 1958 with the Minolta SR-2, which featured semi-automatic diaphragm operation with Auto-Rokkor lenses: winding the film advance lever opened the diaphragm and cocked the shutter; when the shutter was released, the iris would stop down to the selected aperture. These were succeeded by the SR-T models, which incorporated through-the-lens metering in the body, starting from 1966 with the SR-T 101. The SR-T models were succeeded by the X models, which include the X-1 flagship (1973), advanced XE (1974), and compact XD and lowered-cost XG (1977) lines; all of the X models have some form of autoexposure.

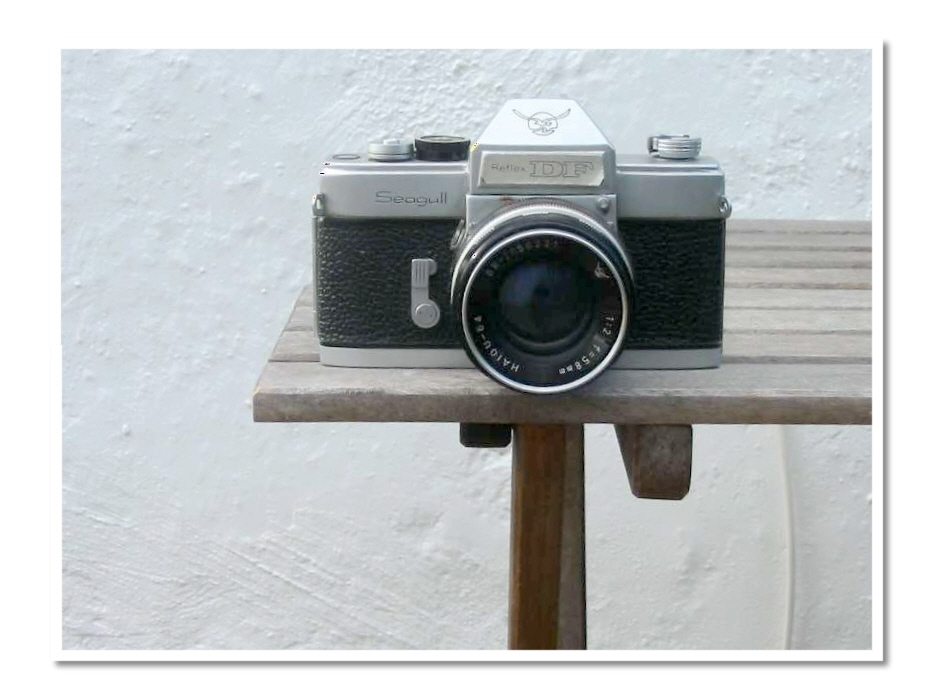
Seagull Reflex DF

Starting from the 1960s, Seagull Camera has sold SLRs with Minolta SR-mount; the first cameras were labeled DF (after Chinese: 单反; pinyin: dānfǎn; lit. 'Single-lens reflex'), and were largely copied from the Minolta SR-2. Most of these were produced for the domestic market in China, but some were exported under multiple brands, including Seagull.

The modular XG line was developed into the X-700/570/370 line in the early 1980s. After Minolta introduced its autofocus A-mount system in 1985 under the trade names α (alpha, Japan), Maxxum (Americas), and Dynax (Europe), demand for the earlier manual-focus cameras dwindled. Minolta licensed the design of the X-370 to Seagull in 1987 and one more SR-mount SLR camera was released in 1990, the X-9 (aka X-300s in Europe); Minolta quietly outsourced production of the X-370 to Seagull in 1995, which continued to produce Minolta and Seagull-branded cameras based on the X-370 for a prolonged period.

Minolta SR-mount SLR timeline
| Year Market | | 1950s | | 1960s | | | | | | | | | | 1970s | | | | | | | | | | 1980s | | | | | | | | | | 1990s | | | | | | | | | | 2000s | | | |
| Year Market | | 8 | 9 | 0 | 1 | 2 | 3 | 4 | 5 | 6 | 7 | 8 | 9 | 0 | 1 | 2 | 3 | 4 | 5 | 6 | 7 | 8 | 9 | 0 | 1 | 2 | 3 | 4 | 5 | 6 | 7 | 8 | 9 | 0 | 1 | 2 | 3 | 4 | 5 | 6 | 7 | 8 | 9 | 0 | 1 | 2 | 3 |
|---|---|---|---|---|---|---|---|---|---|---|---|---|---|---|---|---|---|---|---|---|---|---|---|---|---|---|---|---|---|---|---|---|---|---|---|---|---|---|---|---|---|---|---|---|---|---|---|
| Professional / System | | —N/a | | | | | | | | | | | | SRM | | | | | | X-1 (XK, XM) Motor | | | | | | —N/a | | | AF A-Mount Systems | | | | | | | | | | | | | | | | | | |
| Professional / System | | —N/a | | | | | | | | | | | | | | X-1 (XK, XM) | | | | | | | | | | —N/a | | | AF A-Mount Systems | | | | | | | | | | | | | | | | | | |
| Enthusiast | Semi-Pro | —N/a | | | | | | | | | | | | | | | | XE (XE-7, XE-1) | | | XD (XD-11, XD-7) | | | | | | | | —N/a | | | | | | | | | | | | | | | | | | |
| Enthusiast | Semi-Pro | —N/a | | | | | | | | | | | | | | | | | | XE-b | —N/a | | | XD-s | | —N/a | | | | | | | | | | | | | | | | | | | | | |
| Enthusiast | Prothusiast | —N/a | | | | | | | | | | | | | | | | | XE-5 | | | —N/a | XD-5 | | X-700 | | | | | | | | | | | | | | | | | | | | | —N/a | |
| Enthusiast | Prothusiast | —N/a | | | | | | | | | | | | | | | | | | | | | | | | | X-600 | | —N/a | | | | | | | | | | | | | | | | | | |
| Enthusiast | Prothusiast | —N/a | | | | | | | | | | | | | | | | | | | | | | | | | X-500 (X-570) | | | —N/a | | | | | | | | | | | | | | | | | |
| Enthusiast | Upgraded | —N/a | | | | | | | | | | | | | | | SR-T 102 (303, Super) | | | SR-T 202 (303b, SR505) | | SR-T 202 (303b, SR505s) | —N/a | | X-70 (XG-M) | | | | —N/a | | | | | | | | | | | | | | | | | | |
| Enthusiast | Upgraded | —N/a | | | | | | | | | | | | | | | SR-T 102 (303, Super) | | | SR-T 202 (303b, SR505) | | XG-SE | | —N/a | X-70 (XG-M) | | | | —N/a | | | | | | | | | | | | | | | | | | |
| Enthusiast | Standard | SR-2 | | SR-3 | | SR-7 | | | | | —N/a | | | | | | | | | | XG-7 (XG-2, XG-E) | | XG-9 (XG-S) | | | —N/a | | | | | | | | | | | | | | | | | | | | | |
| Enthusiast | Standard | SR-2 | | SR-3 | | —N/a | | | | SR-T 101 | | | | | | | | | | SR-T 201 (101b,SR101) | | SR-T 201 (101b,SR101s) | | | | —N/a | | | | | | | | | | | | | | | | | | | | | |
| Hobbyist | Entry-level | —N/a | SR-1 | | | | | | | | SR-1s | | | | | SR-T 100 | | | | SR-T 200 (100b) | —N/a | XG-1 | | | XG-1n | | | | —N/a | | | | | X-300s (X-370N, X-9) | | | | | X-370s (Post-Minolta; Seagull DF-3xx) | | | | | | | | |
| Hobbyist | Entry-level | —N/a | SR-1 | | | | | | | | SR-1s | | | | | SR-T 100 | | | | SR-T 200 (100b) | SR-T 200 (100x) | | | | | —N/a | | X-300 (X-370, X-7A) | | | | | | X-300s (X-370N, X-9) | | | | | X-370s (Post-Minolta; Seagull DF-3xx) | | | | | | | | |
| Hobbyist | Amateur | —N/a | | | | | | | | | | | | | | | | | | | | | | X-7 (XG-A) | | | | —N/a | | | | | | | | | | | | | | | | | | | |

== List of cameras ==
Minolta SR-mount cameras
| Regional name | | | Special model(s) | Image | Years | | Shutter speeds | Meter | Dimensions (W×D×H) | Weight | Notes / Refs. |
| JP (Note: Japan and Asia) | NA (Note: North America) | EU (Note: Europe) | Special model(s) | Image | Intro | Disc | Shutter speeds | Meter | Dimensions (W×D×H) | Weight | Notes / Refs. |
SR-x cameras (1958–1971)
| SR-2 | | | —N/a | | 1958 | 1960 | B+1–1/1000 | —N/a | ? | ? | |
| SR-1 | | | —N/a | | 1959 | 1967 | B+1–1/500 | External | 143×32×93 mm (5.6×1.3×3.7 in) | 670 g (24 oz) | Updates in 1960, 1962, 1963; significant updates in 1961 (automatic diaphragm) and 1965 (Model V), distinguished by rectangular eyepiece. |
| SR-3 | | | —N/a | | 1960 | 1962 | B+1–1/1000 | External | ? | ? | Can be fitted with Minolta SR Meter; added automatic diaphragm in 1961. |
| SR-7 | | | —N/a | | 1962 | 1966 | B+1–1/1000 | non-TTL (CdS) | ? | ? | Includes in-body, non-TTL CdS meter near rewind crank; mirror lock-up added. 1965 update (Model V) to take Series V accessories, distinguished by rectangular eyepiece. |
| SR-1S | | | —N/a | | 1967 | 1971 | B+1–1/1000 | External | ? | ? | Uses SR-T 101 components & SR-1 Model V accessories. |
| Regional name | | | Special model(s) | Image | Years | | Shutter speeds | Meter | Dimensions (W×D×H) | Weight | Notes / Refs. |
| JP | NA | EU | Special model(s) | Image | Intro | Disc | Shutter speeds | Meter | Dimensions (W×D×H) | Weight | Notes / Refs. |
SR-T xxx cameras (1966–1981)
| SR-T 101 | | | SR-T SC (Sears), SR-T MC (K-Mart/ J.C. Penney), both 1973–75 | | 1966 | 1975 | B+1–1/1000 | TTL (CdS) | 145×48×94 mm (5.7×1.9×3.7 in) | 705 g (24.9 oz) | SC, MC, and late versions removed mirror lock-up. SC and MC removed self-timer. |
| SR-T 100 | | | —N/a | | 1970 | 1975 | B+1–1/500 | TTL (CdS) | ? | ? | Simplified version of 101, replaces SR-1s; removed mirror lock-up and self-timer. |
| SRM | | | —N/a | | 1970 | 1975 | B+1–1/1000 | —N/a | ? | ? | Includes permanently-fixed motordrive unit. |
| SR-T Super | SR-T 102 | SR-T 303 | —N/a | | 1973 | 1975 | B+1–1/1000 | TTL (CdS) | 145×89×94 mm (5.7×3.5×3.7 in) (with 50mm f/1.4) | 1,020 g (36 oz) (with 50mm f/1.4) | Aperture setting visible in viewfinder. |
| SR-505, 505s | SR-T 202 | SR-T 303b | —N/a | | 1975 | 1980 | B+1–1/1000 | TTL (CdS) | ? | ? | Similar to 102 but mirror lock-up removed; minor updates in 1977. |
| SR-101, 101s | SR-T 201 | SR-T 101b | SR-T SC-II (Sears), SR-T MC-II (KM/ JCP), both 1977–80 | | 1975 | 1981 | B+1–1/1000 | TTL (CdS) | 145×47.5×95 mm (5.7×1.9×3.7 in) | 705 g (24.9 oz) | Removed mirror lock-up, compared to 101; CLC removed from light meter in 1977 (101s). Some features stripped for SC/MC. |
| SR-T 100X | SR-T 200 | SR-T 100b | —N/a | | 1975 | 1981 | B+1–1/1000 | TTL (CdS) | 145×47.5×95 mm (5.7×1.9×3.7 in) | 690 g (24 oz) | Simplified version of 201; CLC removed from light meter in 1977. |
| Regional name | | | Special model(s) | Image | Years | | Shutter speeds | Meter {modes} (Note: All X-series cameras include (M)anual metering mode unless otherwise noted. All X-series cameras additionally include (A)perture-priority, (S)hutter-priority, and/or (P)rogram autoexposure modes.) | Dimensions (W×D×H) | Weight | Notes / Refs. |
| JP | NA | EU | Special model(s) | Image | Intro | Disc | Shutter speeds | Meter {modes} | Dimensions (W×D×H) | Weight | Notes / Refs. |
Xn cameras (1973–1996)
| X-1 | XK | XM | XK Ritz (1978) | | 1972 | 1981 | B+16–1/2000 | TTL (CdS, Si) {AM} | 147.5×48×109.5 mm (5.8×1.9×4.3 in) | 895 g (31.6 oz) | Professional modular system camera with interchangeable finders. |
| XE | XE-7 | XE-1 | —N/a | | 1974 | 1977 | B+4–1/1000 | TTL (CdS) {AM} | ? | ? | Shutter developed with Leitz and Copal; related to Leica R3 |
| XEb | XE-5 | | —N/a | | 1975 | 1977 | B+4–1/1000 | TTL (CdS) {AM} | ? | ? | Simplified version of XE; multi-exposure added for XEb |
| X-1 Motor | XK Motor | XM Motor | —N/a | | 1976 | 1981 | B+16–1/2000 | TTL (CdS, Si) {AM} | 147.5×83×171 mm (5.8×3.3×6.7 in) | 1,445 g (51.0 oz) | Integral motor drive with detachable battery pack. |
| XD | XD-11 | XD-7 | XD-s | | 1977 | 1984 | B+1–1/1000 | TTL (Si) {ASM} | 136×51×86 mm (5.4×2.0×3.4 in) | 560 g (20 oz) | Related to Leica R4–R7 |
| XG-E | XG-7 | XG-2 | XG-SE | | 1977 | 1984 | B+1–1/1000 | TTL (CdS) {AM} | 138×52×88 mm (5.4×2.0×3.5 in) | 506 g (17.8 oz) | Replaced XE-5, compact SLR; XG-SE included "Accu-Matte" screen. |
| — | XG-1 | | XG-1n | | 1978 (n-type 1981) | 1981 (n-type 1984) | B+1–1/1000 | TTL (CdS) {AM} | 135×52×88 mm (5.3×2.0×3.5 in) | 490 g (17 oz) | Simplified version of XG-E. XG-1n released in 1981, redesigned in X-Hundred bodystyle distinguished (n) by Manuals |
| — | XD-5 | | —N/a | | 1979 | 1979 | B+1–1/1000 | TTL (Si) {ASM} | 136.5×51×87 mm (5.4×2.0×3.4 in) | 525 g (18.5 oz) | Simplified version of XD |
| XG-S | XG-9 | | —N/a | | 1979 | 1981 | B+1–1/1000 | TTL (CdS) {AM} | ? | ? | Replaces XG-E. |
| X-700 | | | —N/a | | 1981 | ? | B+1–1/1000 | TTL (Si) {PAM} | 137×51.5×89 mm (5.4×2.0×3.5 in) | 505 g (17.8 oz) | |
| X-7 | XG-A | | —N/a | | 1981 | 1984 | B+1–1/1000 | TTL (CdS) {A} | 138×52×85 mm (5.4×2.0×3.3 in) | 485 g (17.1 oz) | Simplified version of XG-1. X-7 released in Japan, 1980; autoexposure mode only. |
| X-70 | XG-M | | —N/a | | 1981 | 1984 | B+1–1/1000 | TTL (CdS) {AM} | 136×52×89 mm (5.4×2.0×3.5 in) | 515 g (18.2 oz) | Update to XG-9; includes provision to add motordrive. |
| X-500 | X-570 | X-500 | —N/a | | 1983 | ? | B+1–1/1000 | TTL (Si) {AM} | 137×51.5×89 mm (5.4×2.0×3.5 in) | 505 g (17.8 oz) | Simplified version of X-700 |
| X-600 | | | —N/a | | 1983 | 1984 | B+1–1/1000 | TTL (Si) {AM} | ? | ? | Includes focus confirmation, features similar to X-570 |
| X-370 | | X-300 | X-7A | | 1984 | ? | B+1–1/1000 | TTL (Si) {AM} | 137×51.5×90 mm (5.4×2.0×3.5 in) | 470 g (17 oz) | Simplified version of X-570, replaced XG-line. |
| X-9 | X-370N | X-300s | —N/a | | 1990 | 1995 | B+1–1/1000 | TTL (Si) {AM} | ? | ? | Updated X-370 |
| X-370s | | | Seagull DF-300 | — | 1995 | 2003 (as Minolta, Seagull DF's still sold as of 2026) | B+1–1/1000 | TTL (Si) {AM} | ? | ? | Last Minolta Manual Focus SLR, manufactured by Seagull. Later relicensed as 'Seagull DF-3xx and 3xxx' types, among others. |
