= Chris McAndrew =

British portrait photographer

- Born: 1 February 1974
- Education: Chelsea College of Arts
- Occupation: Portrait photographer
- Website: www.mcandrewphoto.co.uk

Chris McAndrew (born 1 February 1974) is a British photographer, known for celebrity portraits including Snoop Dogg and Charlotte Rampling. In 2017 he was commissioned to develop a collection of freely-licensed images of Parliament for the Parliamentary Digital Service, including a set of official portraits of MPs and peers.

== Early life and education ==
McAndrew grew up in West Yorkshire's Rhubarb Triangle, and took his first photographs with a second-hand Minolta X-500 at the age of 10. He studied painting and photography at Chelsea School of Art.

== Official parliamentary portraits ==
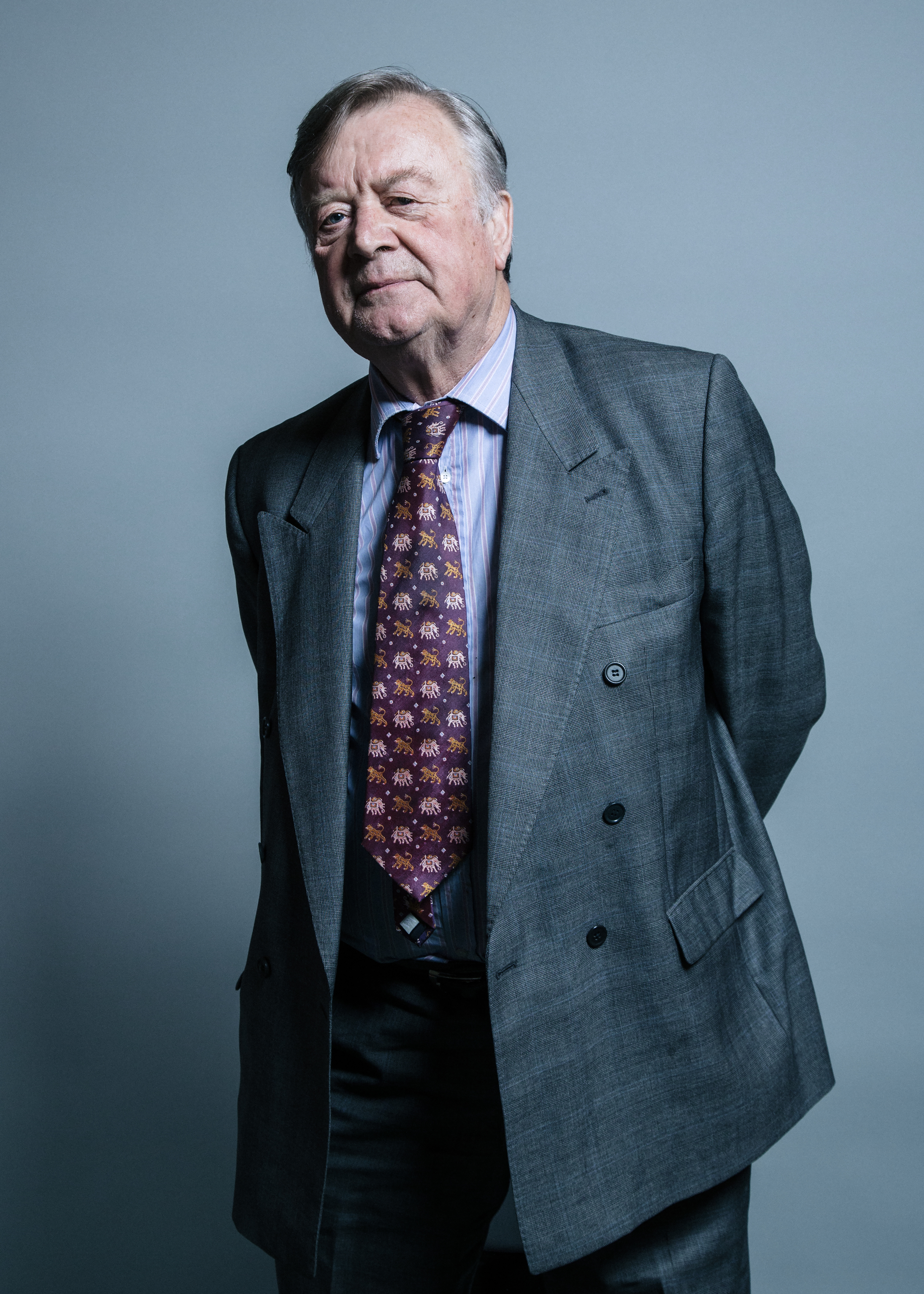
McAndrew's official portrait of Kenneth Clarke, the then Father of the House

The plan had been to take photographs of MPs after work in three other categories: "modernity and tradition", "the people that make the palace" and "public engagement". The announcement of the 2017 general election to be held on 8 June gave an unexpected opportunity to photograph most of the 650 newly elected, or re-elected, MPs within two days, as they each attended Parliament to be sworn in before taking their seats. McAndrew shot over 15,000 images during two days, working in the "Reason Room" behind the Speaker's Chair.

Carrie Barclay, who led the project, said:

Chris's distinctive style and ability to put people immediately at ease meant we could capture a raw, but sophisticated, image that showed MPs as relatable people.

The images are available for reuse under a Creative Commons "Attribution 3.0 Unported" licence.

In March 2018, similar portraits of members of the House of Lords were released, under the same license.

The Times reported that several MPs had complained about the photographs, one having described them as making members look like "the most dysfunctional set of secondary school staff ever", and at least one MP had had their photograph removed from the parliamentary website at their request.
