= Sr2 =

Sr2, SR2 and variants may refer to

- .sr2, a filename extension for Raw image format
- Manx SR2 a 1970 American kit car
- Minolta SR-2, a camera
- Saints Row 2, a computer game
- Space Rangers 2: Dominators, a computer game
- Slime Rancher 2 (2025 Video Game)
- SR-2 Veresk, a submachine gun
- VR Class Sr2, a Finnish electric locomotive
- Normandy SR-2, a spacecraft from Mass Effect 2
- Ormazd, one of the quadrangles of the moon Rhea
- State Route 2 or State Road 2; see List of highways numbered 2
- SR2, a competition class of the FIA Sportscar Championship
- SR2, the second radio station of the Saarländischer Rundfunk launched 1953
- SR2, a high specification version of the Ford Laser
