= Minolta XE =

35mm single-lens reflex camera

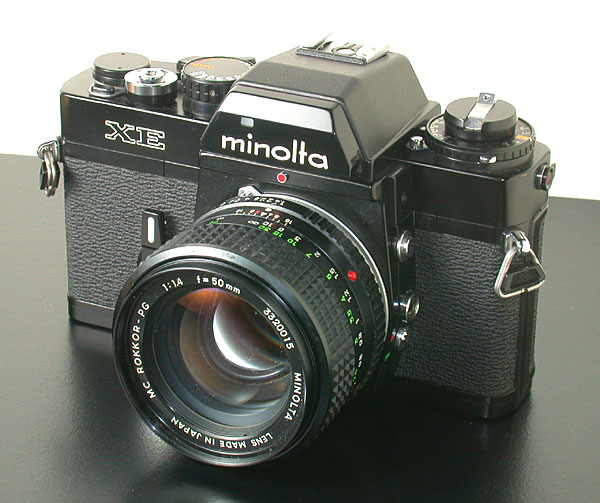
- Minolta XE camera

Overview
- Maker: Minolta
- Type: 35mm SLR camera
- Released: 1974
- Production: 1974-1977

Lens
- Lens mount: Minolta SR mount

Focusing
- Focus: manual

Exposure/metering
- Exposure: Aperture priority or manual

Flash
- Flash: hot shoe

General
- Made in: Japan

The Minolta XE, known as the XE-1 in Europe and the XE-7 in North America, is a manual focus, 35 mm single-lens reflex camera produced by Minolta of Japan between 1974 and 1977. It was developed in collaboration with Leica Camera and has many similarities to the Leica R3.

The XE uses a Leitz-Copal electronic, vertically traveling, metal blade focal plane shutter supporting exposure times of 1/1000 of a second to four seconds, plus bulb setting. In aperture priority auto-exposure mode, the shutter speed is varied steplessly; in manual mode, the shutter speeds are selected in whole stop increments. The camera has a very short shutter lag of about 38ms, among the best for an SLR regardless of manufacturer.

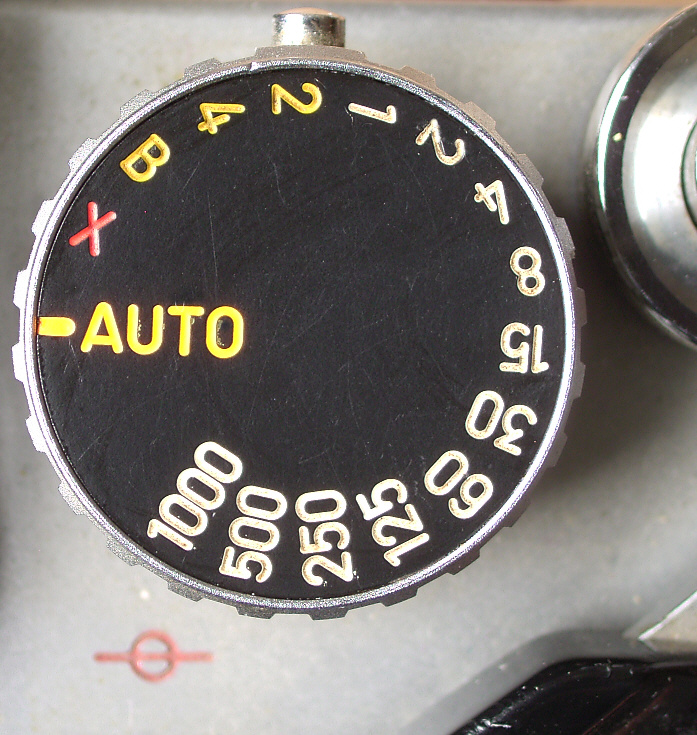
Detail
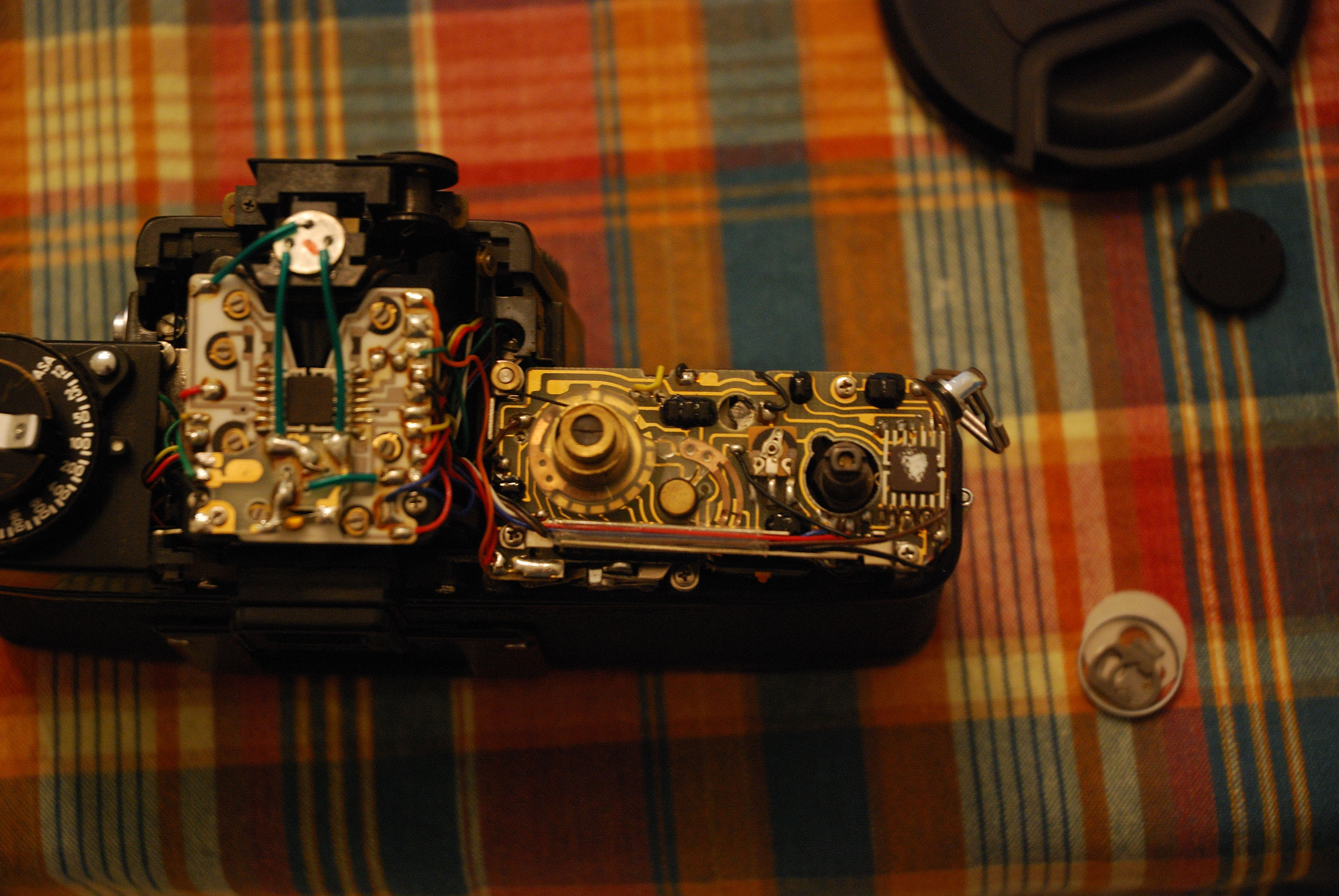
XE-7 with covers removed, exposing the electronics

== See also ==
- Minolta X-1
- Minolta XE-5
- Minolta XD
