= Minolta SR-T 101 =

1966 35mm single-lens reflex camera

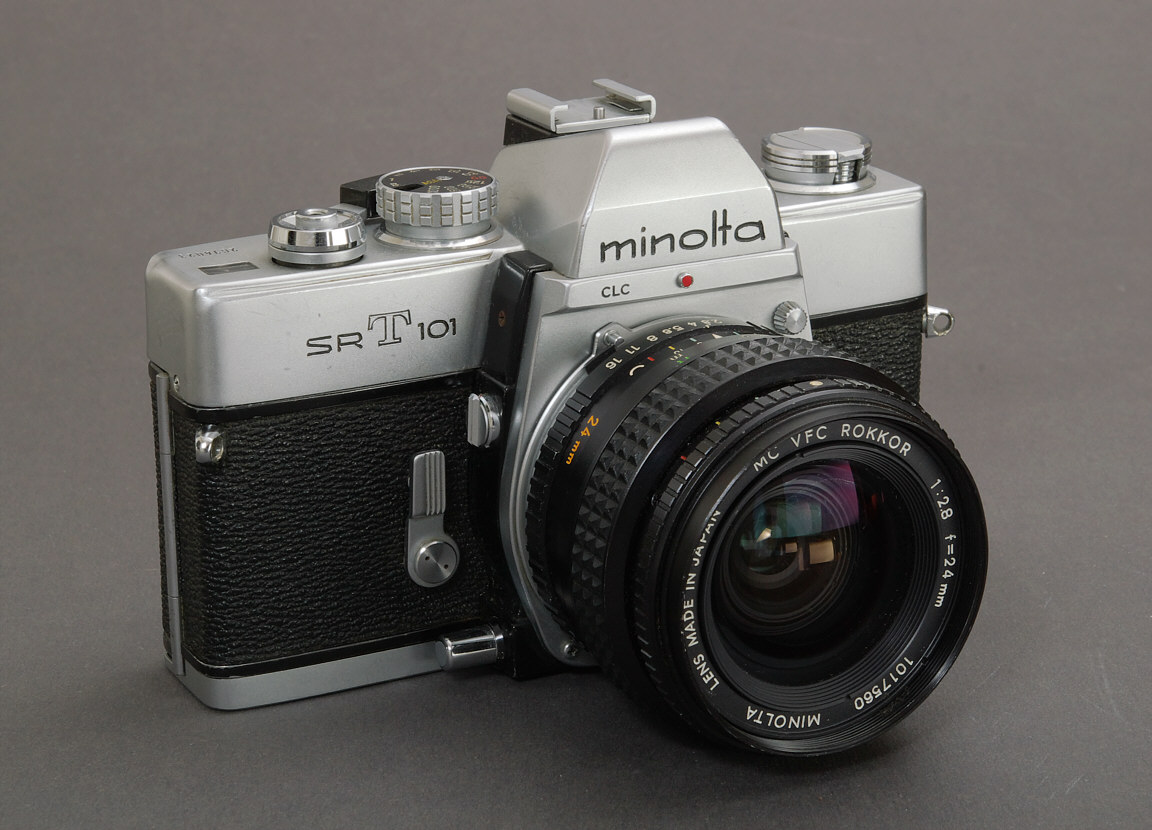

Overview
- Maker: Minolta
- Type: 35 mm SLR
- Released: 1966
- Production: 1966-1976

Lens
- Lens mount: Minolta SR mount

Focusing
- Focus: Manual, micro prism with Fresnel lens provided in SLR finder

Exposure/metering
- Exposure: TTL meter, manually set aperture and shutter speed (Bulb, 1 to 1/1000 sec)

Flash
- Flash: Cold shoe, FP & 1/60 sec X-sync

General
- Dimensions: 51×86×136 mm (2.0×3.4×5.4 in), 560 g
- Made in: Japan

The Minolta SR-T 101 is a 35mm manual focus SLR camera with Through-The-Lens exposure metering – TTL for short - that was launched in 1966 by Minolta Camera Co. It was aimed at demanding amateur and semi-professional photographers. The SR-T 101 stayed in production for ten years with only minor changes.

== Description ==
The design is based on the Minolta SR-7 model V camera of 1962, but the principal design is inherited from the original 1958 Minolta SR-2. The SR-T 101 however, has several significant features apart from the TTL meter. The most significant one is perhaps the full aperture metering facility, allowing the exposure to be set accurately without stopping down. Full aperture TTL metering was commercially first realised in the 1963 Tokyo Kogaku Topcon RE Super.

Another unique feature of the SR-T 101 besides the open aperture metering at the time of its release to the public at Photokina in 1966 was the so called "CLC"-metering characteristic. "CLC" stands for "contrast-light-compensation" and was a kind of an early Matrix metering: Two CdS-cells, placed at the front and rear end of the viewfinder prism, provide an overlapping coverage of the center-weighted light-detection area and are electronically coupled together. Therefore the metering system always detects an average of the light travelling through the lens, determined by the contrast division of the metered motive. Landscape photographs with a large area of bright sky and a smaller area of dark ground, for example, are automatically corrected by the contrast-matching "CLC"-metering system. This system works for almost every landscape-format image regardless of the metered contrast range, but requires a much more skilled usage when it comes to portrait-format images. Because of this, Minolta recommended SR-T 101-users to first meter the photographed area and then to swing up the camera for taking the picture to enable the "CLC" an accurate metering.

Due to a large pentaprism and double-hinged reflex mirror, the SR-T 101 has an extremely bright viewfinder with a central micro prism focusing aid that in most cases proves to be appropriate, requiring no apparent lines in the motive, since all out of focus objects appear to shimmer. Shutter speed and match needle exposure is visible in the viewfinder, including a battery check index mark showing the required meter needle deflection for a healthy battery when the ON/OFF meter switch on the camera base is set to BC.

The SR-T 101 was also available in black. The top cover and the base plate are finished in black enamel while most metal parts are black chromed, but the wind lever is black anodised. The parts still chromed, to name the most obvious ones, include the shutter-release button, the mirror lock-up knob, the depth-of-field preview button and the lens-release button.

== Standard MC Rokkor lenses for the SR-T 101 ==
The normal standard lens for the Minolta SR-T 101 is the MC Rokkor-PF 1:1.4 f=58mm. The MC refers to the aperture meter coupling, required to operate properly on the SR-T 101, and the PF to the lens construction comprising a five group design using six glass elements. Two alternative standard lenses were also made available for the Minolta SR-T 101; the 1:1.7 f=55mm is the economy model, and the 1:1.2 f=58mm the most expensive alternative:

- MC Rokkor-PF 1:1.7 f=55mm – size 52mm filter
- MC Rokkor-PF 1:1.4 f=58mm – size 55mm filter
- MC Rokkor-PG 1:1.2 f=58mm – size 55mm filter
- MC Rokkor-PF 1:1.9 f=55mm – size 52mm filter

== MC Rokkor lenses ==
The range of Rokkor lenses became quite extensive and included highly respected designs like the Macro Rokkor-QF 1:3.5 f=50mm and the extremely rare MC Rokkor-PF 1:2 f=100mm. A new line of Rokkor lenses were launched with the camera featuring the MC full-aperture metering:

- MC W.Rokkor-SG 1:3.5 f=28mm (67mm filter)
- MC W.Rokkor-HG 1:2.8 f=35mm
- MC Rokkor-PF 1:1.7 f=55mm (new) (52mm filter)
- MC Rokkor-PF 1:1.4 f=58mm
- MC Tele Rokkor-PF 1:2 f=100mm (62mm filter)
- MC Tele Rokkor-QE 1:3.5 f=100mm (52mm filter)
- MC Tele Rokkor-PF 1:2.8 f=135mm
- MC Tele Rokkor-QD 1:3.5 f=135mm (new)
- MC Tele Rokkor-QF 1:3.5 f=200mm

These had 55 mm filter threads except where noted. Two new optical designs were introduced in the 55 mm 1:1.7 and 135 mm 1:3.5; the others were upgrades of the older Auto Rokkor lenses. The SR-T 101 retained compatibility with the earlier lenses with stop-down metering. A range of new MC lenses were introduced between 1966 and 1976, when they were superseded by the MD Rokkor line in 1977.

== Features ==
- Through-The-Lens (TTL), full-aperture metering
- Predecessor to the modern matrix metering system, called Contrast Light Compensation (CLC)
- Mirror lock-up (on earlier models)
- Depth-of-field preview
- Shutter speed visible in viewfinder
- Self timer
- Mechanical, horizontal travel, focal-plane shutter
- Minolta MC (Meter Coupled) Lens Mount
