= Minolta XG-1 =

35mm single-lens reflex (SLR) camera

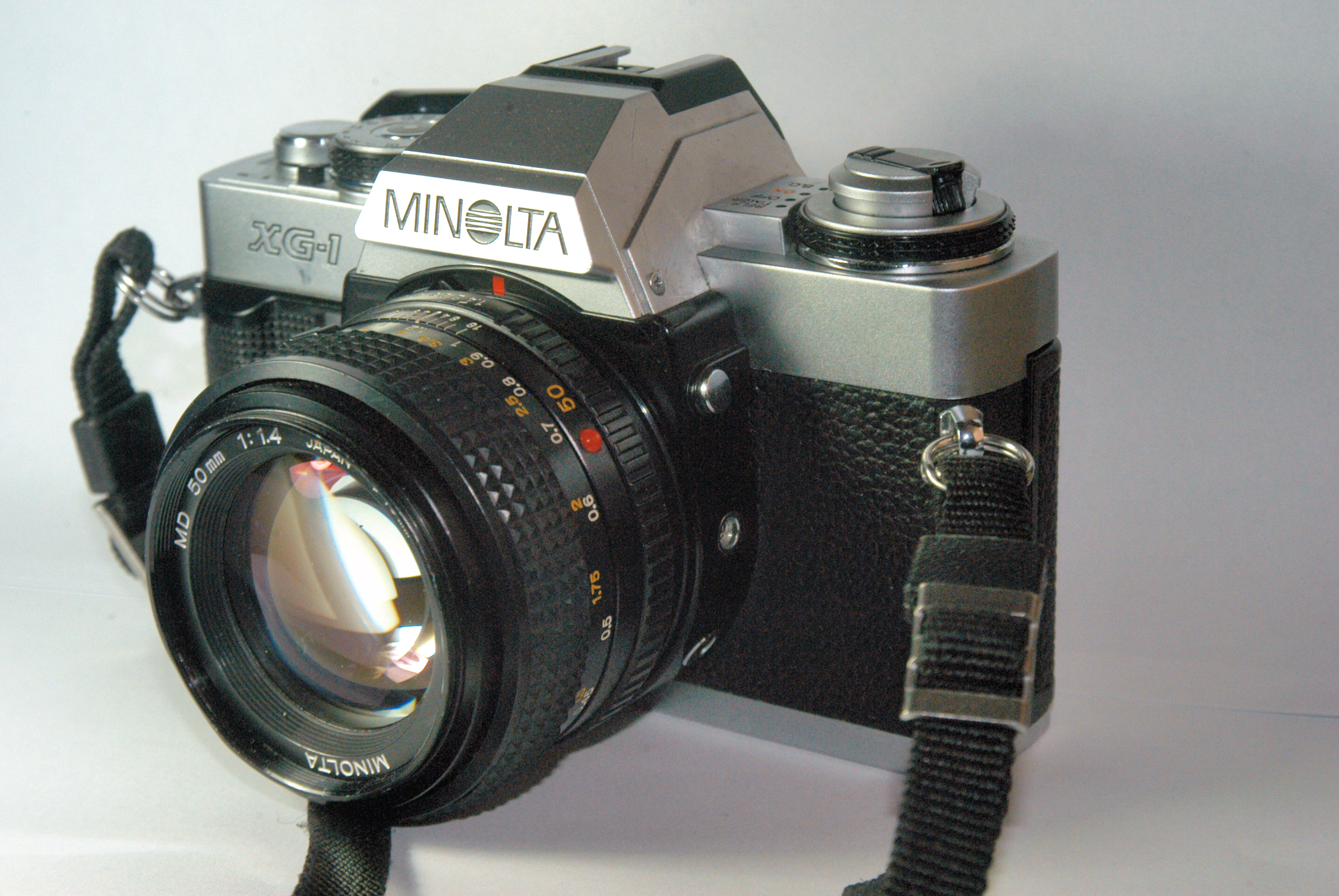
- Minolta XG-1(n), one of the newer versions of the Minolta XG-1

Overview
- Maker: Minolta
- Type: 35 mm SLR

Lens
- Lens mount: Minolta SR-mount

Sensor/medium
- Film advance: Manual

Focusing
- Focus: Manual

Exposure/metering
- Exposure metering: Full aperture TTL, center-weighted

Flash
- Flash synchronization: 1/60th

Shutter
- Shutter: Aperture priority, manual
- Shutter speeds: 1s to 1/1000s, bulb

General
- Battery: SR44/LR44
- Weight: 490 g (17 oz) (without battery)
- Made in: Japan

Chronology
- Predecessor: Minolta XG-E

Minolta XG-1 is a 35mm SLR film camera manufactured by Minolta between 1977 and 1984. It is the second model to appear in the XG series of cameras, succeeding the Minolta XG-E (1977). The Minolta XG-1 has gone through various renaming and redesign all throughout its production run.

The last version of the XG-1 is marketed as Minolta XG-1(n), featuring a new design closely similar to the top of the line, Minolta XG-M.

Paul Goresh, an amateur photographer, used the Minolta XG-1 to capture the final photograph of John Lennon on December 8, 1980, shortly before Lennon's assassination.

== Versions ==
=== Minolta XG 1 ===
The Minolta XG 1 is basically a Minolta XG-E with less informative viewfinder and fixed film door. The range between 1/15s and 1/2s shutter speed was represented only by one LED. It also lacks the memo holder although it had a DIN/ASA conversion scale sticker on the film door. This version features the old Minolta logo.

=== Minolta XG-1 and XG-1(n) ===
In 1982, Minolta started producing a similar model with a slightly different name. The Minolta XG-1 resembles the original XG 1 except that it now features the new iconic Minolta "rising sun" logo on the prism cover.

The XG-1 was later replaced by the Minolta XG-1(n) where the moniker "n" stands for "new". It features the same Minolta "rising sun" logo and has a completely redesigned body with a plastic grip, resembling that of the high-end Minolta XG-M.

Unlike the XG-M, however, the XG-1(n) is still an aperture priority model with an option for manual exposure. Minolta also added a memo holder on the film door, while also retaining the DIN/ASA conversion scale sticker. The viewfinder has been upgraded with a fixed Acute Matte focusing screen.

Despite the name change, the camera is still engraved with XG-1 on the front. The Minolta XG-1(n) supports Auto Winder G, and various Minolta Auto electroflashes.
