= Minolta X-1 =

1972 35mm single-lens reflex camera

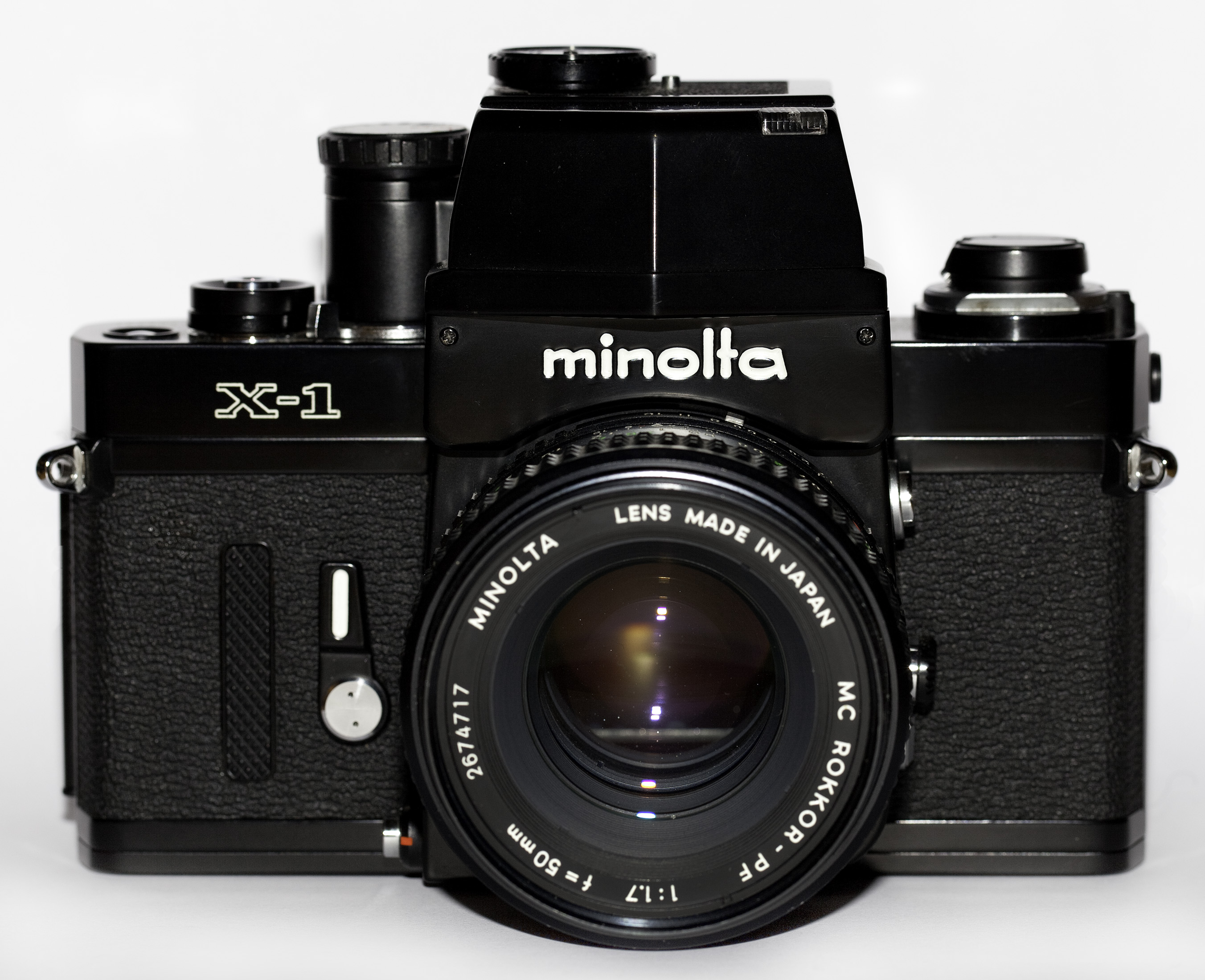
- Minolta X-1, with AE finder

Overview
- Maker: Minolta
- Type: 35mm SLR camera
- Released: 1972

Lens
- Lens mount: Minolta SR-mount

Sensor/medium
- Film format: 135 film
- Film speed: ASA 12–6400

Focusing
- Focus: manual

Exposure/metering
- Exposure: manual, aperture priority

Flash
- Flash synchronization: 1/100 sec.

Shutter
- Shutter speeds: 16–1/2000 sec. + B, X

Viewfinder
- Viewfinder: eye-level pentaprism
- Optional viewfinders: waist-level, high-magnification
- Viewfinder magnification: 0.8×
- Frame coverage: 98%

General
- Battery: 2×SR44 (S76)
- Dimensions: 109.5 mm × 48 mm × 147.5 mm (4.3 in × 1.9 in × 5.8 in) X-1; 171 mm × 83 mm × 147.5 mm (6.7 in × 3.3 in × 5.8 in) X-1 Motor
- Weight: 895 g (31.6 oz) X-1, w/out lens; 1,445 g (51.0 oz) X-1 Motor, w/out lens

The Minolta X-1 (XK in North America, XM in Europe and elsewhere) was the professional model in the Minolta SR-mount line of single-lens reflex cameras (SLR), released in 1972 after ten years of development, which was the first X-series camera in the Minolta SLR system; prior to the X-1, specific Minolta SLR models were branded SR-T, and afterward, they included X in the name. The X-1 was the first SLR to combine an electronically controlled shutter with interchangeable viewfinders.

== History ==
The X-1 was the first of the X-series, and debuted at Photokina '72; it was released in Japan in 1973; the X-1 Motor, a variant with an integrated motordrive, followed in 1976. By 1981, Minolta had discontinued the original XK in the United States, selling only the XK Motor.

A completely new designed lens line was introduced and labelled with 'MC Rokkor-X' in the North American market (the rest of the world kept the plain 'MC Rokkor' designation). The most striking attribute was the new waffled rubber coating of the focus grip.

The X-1 and its export descendants were available in black finish only.

Minolta released the XE (aka XE-7 in North America and XE-1 in Europe) in 1974 which incorporated many of the same features as the X-1, including an aperture-priority autoexposure mode.

== Design ==
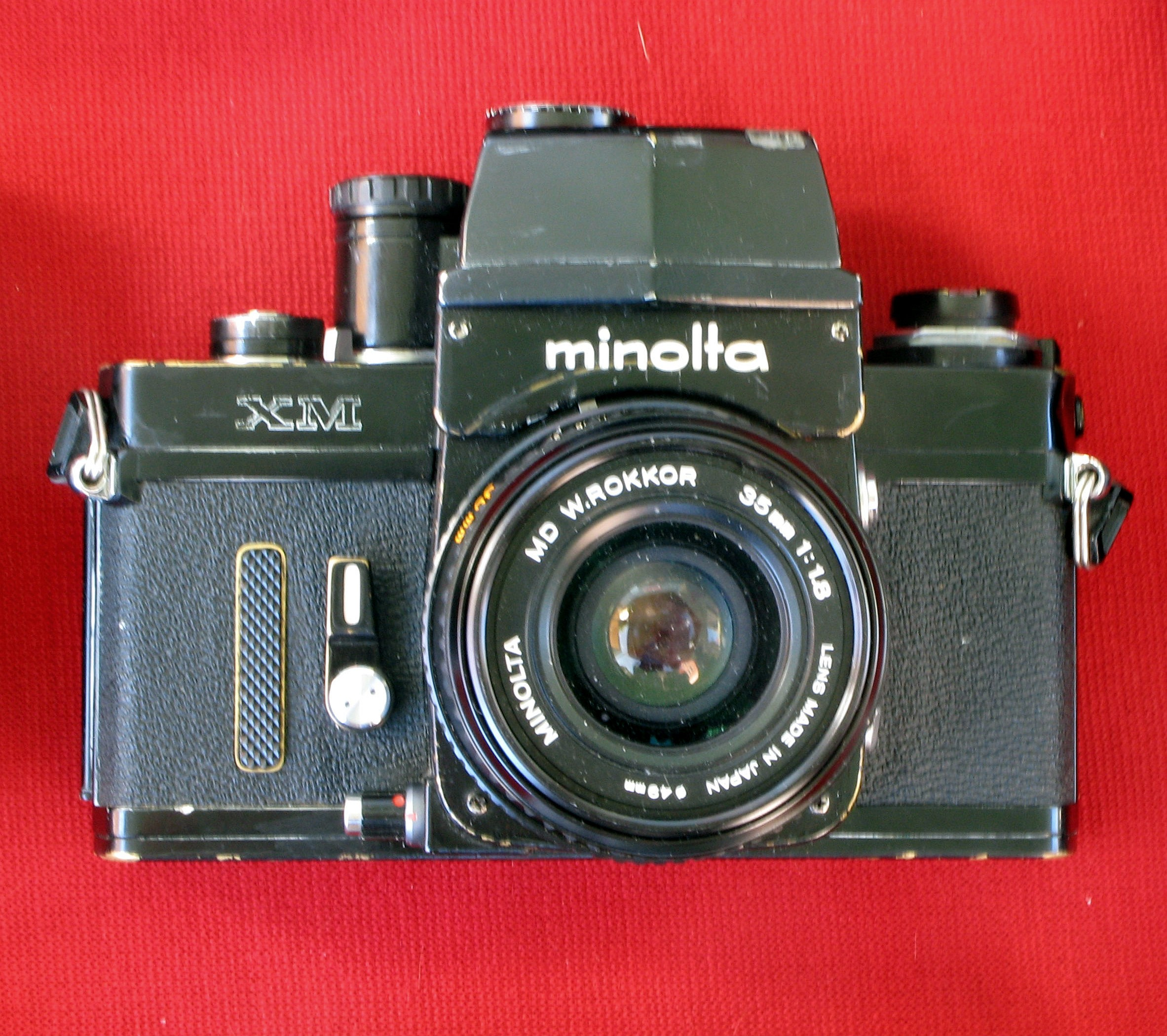
Minolta XM, as branded in Europe, with AE finder

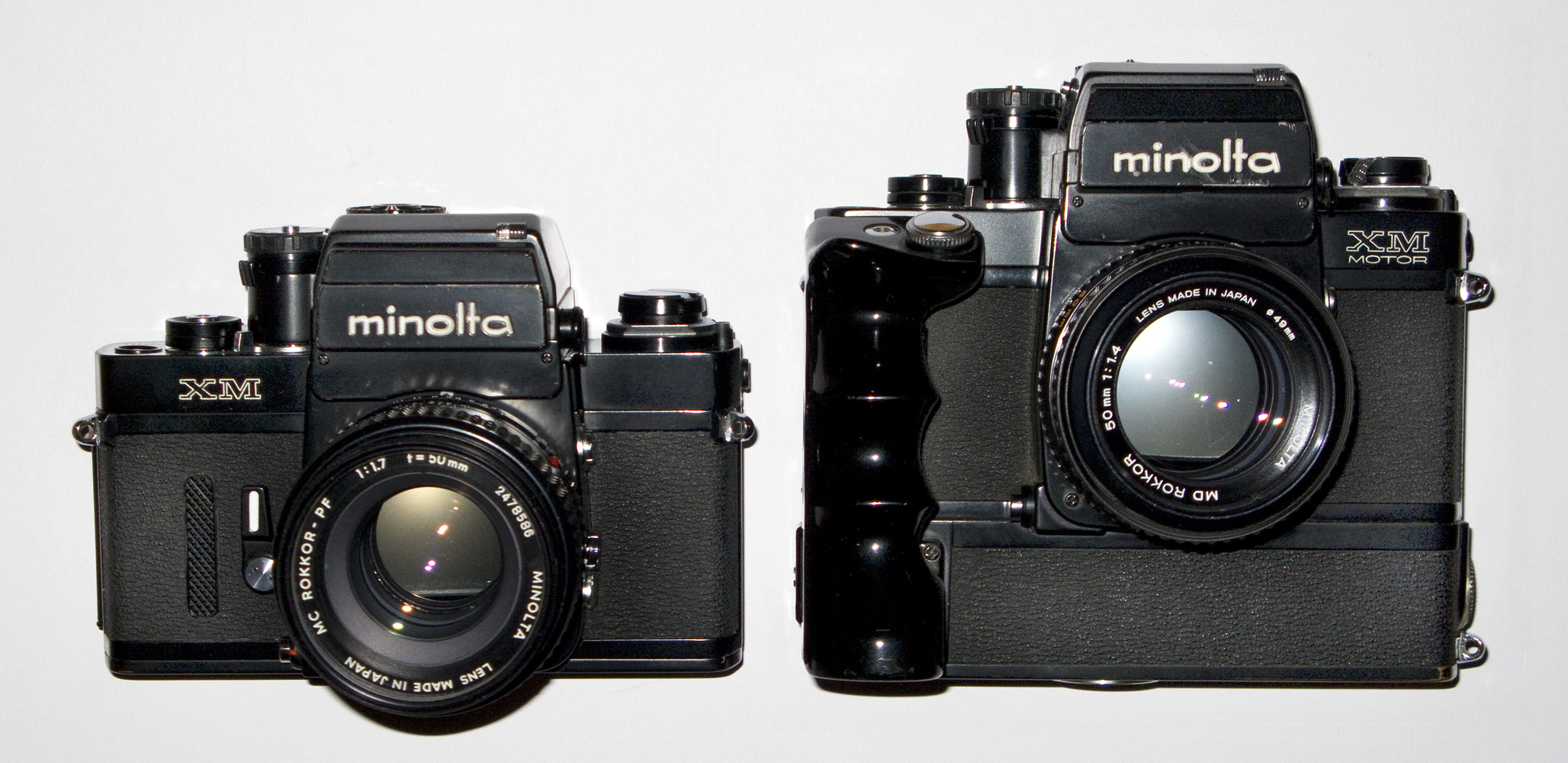
Minolta XM (left) and XM Motor, both with AE-S finders

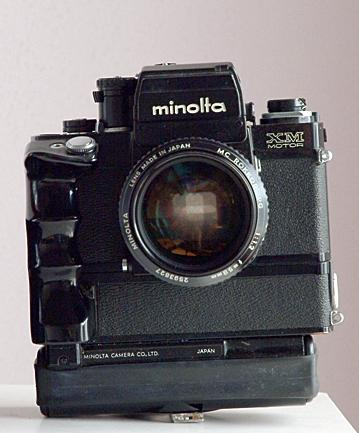
XM Motor with AE-S finder and Standard Battery Pack

The X-1 has a pressure-sensitive "Senswitch" on the front panel, which switches the camera shutter and viewfinder meter on automatically when held in a shooting position; the feature was panned in an initial look, published in 1975 by Ivan Berger for Popular Mechanics. There is an auxiliary power switch for the meter on the AE and AE-S metering viewfinders. If the shutter is released while the camera is in autoexposure mode without the meter being switched on via the "Senswitch", the camera will open the shutter for 30 seconds; to close the shutter immediately, switch the shutter speed selector to X and then back to AUTO.

The focal plane shutter has horizontally-traveling titanium foil curtains, capable of manually selecting speeds in steps from 16 to 1/2000 sec., or continuously variable speeds between 4 and 1/2000 s in autoexposure mode with the AE Finder; this was extended to 8 seconds with the AE-S finder. There are two mechanically timed speeds: labeled "X" for flash synchronization, 1/100 s, and "B" for "B"ulb or "B"utton, where the shutter stays open as long as the shutter release is depressed. The shutter speed is selected on the viewfinder, rather than the body.

Power for the shutter and metering viewfinders is supplied by two SR44/S76 1.5 silver-oxide button cell batteries, housed in the body. On the X-1, these are in a small chamber accessed on the baseplate of the camera.

The camera further has both a flash contact (next to the rewind crank) and a PC socket (on the side of the lens mount escutcheon) for flash synchronisation. The lens mount also has a button which combined the mirror lock-up feature and stop down lever for depth of field preview. Multi-exposure capability was provided by depressing the film advance release button on the base of the camera.

=== X-1 Motor ===
The X-1 Motor offers the same features as the original X-1, but has an integrated motor that provides automatic film advance at 1, 2, 3, or 3.5 ("H") frames per second, or a "S"ingle frame advance setting. It draws power from the Standard Battery Pack, which screws into the tripod socket on the bottom of the handgrip and takes 10 AA batteries. In addition, the X-1 Motor offers motorized film rewind. The X-1 Motor retains the manual film advance lever and rewind knob from the standard X-1, so film transport is still possible without power.

In addition to the standard battery pack, Minolta offered two other battery packs which also took 10 AA batteries:

- "Separate Battery Pack", connected to the motor drive unit by a cord 4 ft (1.2 m) long
- Cylindrical "Battery Grip", with a short 8 1/2 in (220 mm) cable and shutter release button, intended for use with the 250-Frame film back

== Accessories ==
=== Viewfinders ===
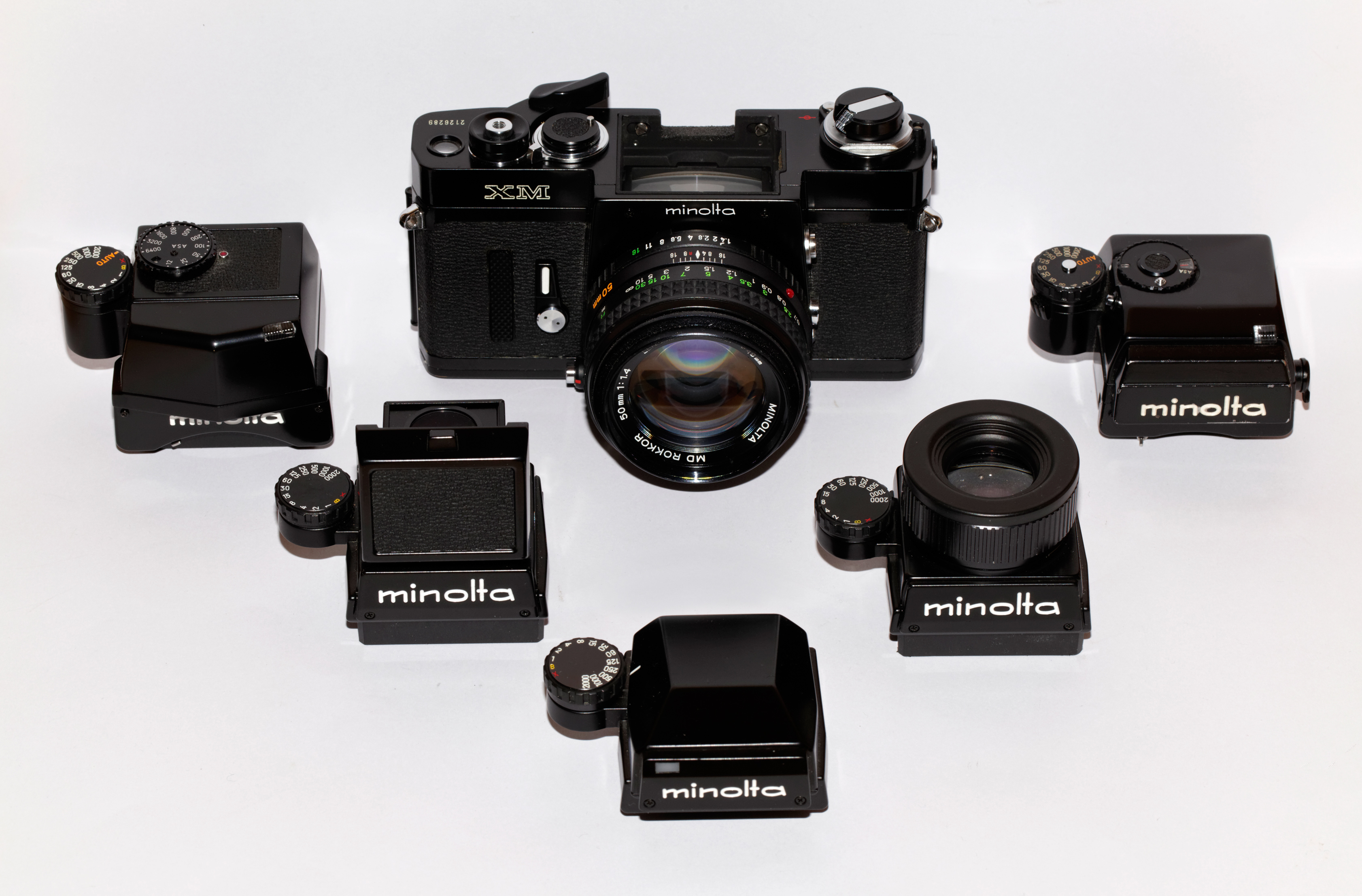
Minolta XM with finders (L–R): AE, W, P, H, AE-S

It had interchangeable finders; the finder model number is written on a label just below the eyepiece:

- AE-Finder: The standard "Auto Electro" finder with a refined "Contrast Light Compensation" (CLC) metering system using two CdS photoresistors, introduced by the SR-T 101. It can operate in either an aperture priority autoexposure mode or match-needle metering for manual exposure. This finder displays both shutter speeds and aperture settings. The minimum illumination that can be read is EV+1.
- M-Finder: The Match-Needle Finder is a simpler and cheaper version of the AE-Finder and like it, contained a CdS metering element, but did not have the automatic exposure mode. It did not show metered shutter times but had only a needle to align, similar to the preceding SR-T cameras. It was discontinued shortly after introduction.
- P-Finder: The plain finder, an unmetered pentaprism finder, gave the X-1 a much more compact silhouette than the bulky finders above.
- H-Finder: Unmetered finder with high (6.2×) magnification ratio and adjustable diopter setting (+3 to –5).
- W-Finder: Unmetered waist-level finder with pop-up magnifier; it has a mild (+1.2) built-in diopter.
- AE-S-Finder: Introduced with the X-1 Motor and equipped with a more responsive silicon photodiode instead of the slower CdS cells used in the earlier AE-Finder. This was necessary to permit auto exposure mode with motorized film advance at multiple frames per second. Autoexposure range is EV–2 to +17 for single-frame operation and EV+3 to +17 with continuous frame advance. In addition, the AE-S finder includes exposure compensation (±2 EV) and screen compensation (-0.5 to +3.5 EV) adjustments.

=== Focusing screens ===
The photographer has the choice of eleven interchangeable focusing screens; nine were available initially upon release, and two more (Types AP and L) were added later. The initial standard screen was the Type P, which shifted later to the Type PM.

Minolta focusing screens for X-1/XK/XM
| Type | Image | Field | Center focusing aid | Notes |
|---|---|---|---|---|
| P | | Ground matte Fresnel | Split-image rangefinder, 4 mm diameter | Suitable for general photography. Early cameras were supplied with Type P as standard. |
| M | | Ground matte Fresnel | Microprism, 4 mm diameter | Suitable for general photography, especially with focal lengths from 35 to 100 mm. |
| PM | | Ground matte Fresnel | Split-image rangefinder, 2.5 mm diameter + microprism collar, 1.5 mm wide | Suitable for general photography; standard screen shipped with cameras. |
| G | | Ground matte Fresnel | [none] | Suitable for general photography, especially for telephoto lenses. |
| C1 / C2 / C3 | | Clear Fresnel | Microprism, 6 mm diameter | Specific screen selected based on lens in use, suitable for low-light photography. In general, requires exposure compensation. |
| AP | | Fine-ground matte Fresnel | Diagonal split-image rangefinder | Suitable for slower lenses (with maximum aperture ≥ f/5.6); in general, requires exposure compensation. |
| L | | Ground matte Fresnel | [none] | Etched grid of horizontal and vertical lines at 6 mm intervals; suitable for use with Shift CA Rokkor lens. |
| H | | Ground matte Fresnel | Clear, 8 mm diameter, with double cross-hair | Uses dioptric / parallax focusing, for astrophotography, photomicrography, or other high-magnification uses. |
| S | | Clear Fresnel | Double cross-hair | Etched measuring scales, used only with H-finder. Uses dioptric / parallax focusing, for astrophotography, photomicrography, or other high-magnification uses. |

Screen C1 can be used with most lenses which have focal lengths ≤ 100 mm, with the exceptions of the 16 mm full-frame fisheye lens and the 17 mm ultra wide angle lens. Screen C2 covers a similar range (≤ 135 mm), including the two exceptions (FL=16 and 17 mm). Screen C3 can be used with most lenses with focal lengths between 50 and 300 mm, and is suitable for some focal lengths less than 85 mm.

=== Other accessories ===
Minolta offered a 250-frame film back which took 33 ft (10 m) of bulk 135 film and used special film cartridges. In addition, Minolta offered the Intervalometer PM for the X-1 Motor, which took five AA batteries and took photographs at intervals that could be set between 0.5 and 60 seconds.

Flashes with a standard hot shoe could be mounted on the camera using a special adapter, which slips over the rewind crank.
