= Minolta XE-5 =

SLR camera

The Minolta XE-5 was a 35 mm single-lens reflex camera produced by Minolta in Japan, introduced in 1975 (50 years ago). It was a simplified and lower-cost version of Minolta's XE/XE-1/XE-7 models, retaining the camera's automatic exposure but removing functionalities such as viewfinder displays, multiple-exposure capability, the built-in eyepiece shutter (replaced by a viewfinder cap on the shoulder strap), the film tab holder and the film advance window. The model was in production until 1977 when the Minolta XG-7 replaced it.
