= Minolta SR-7 =

35 mm SLR camera

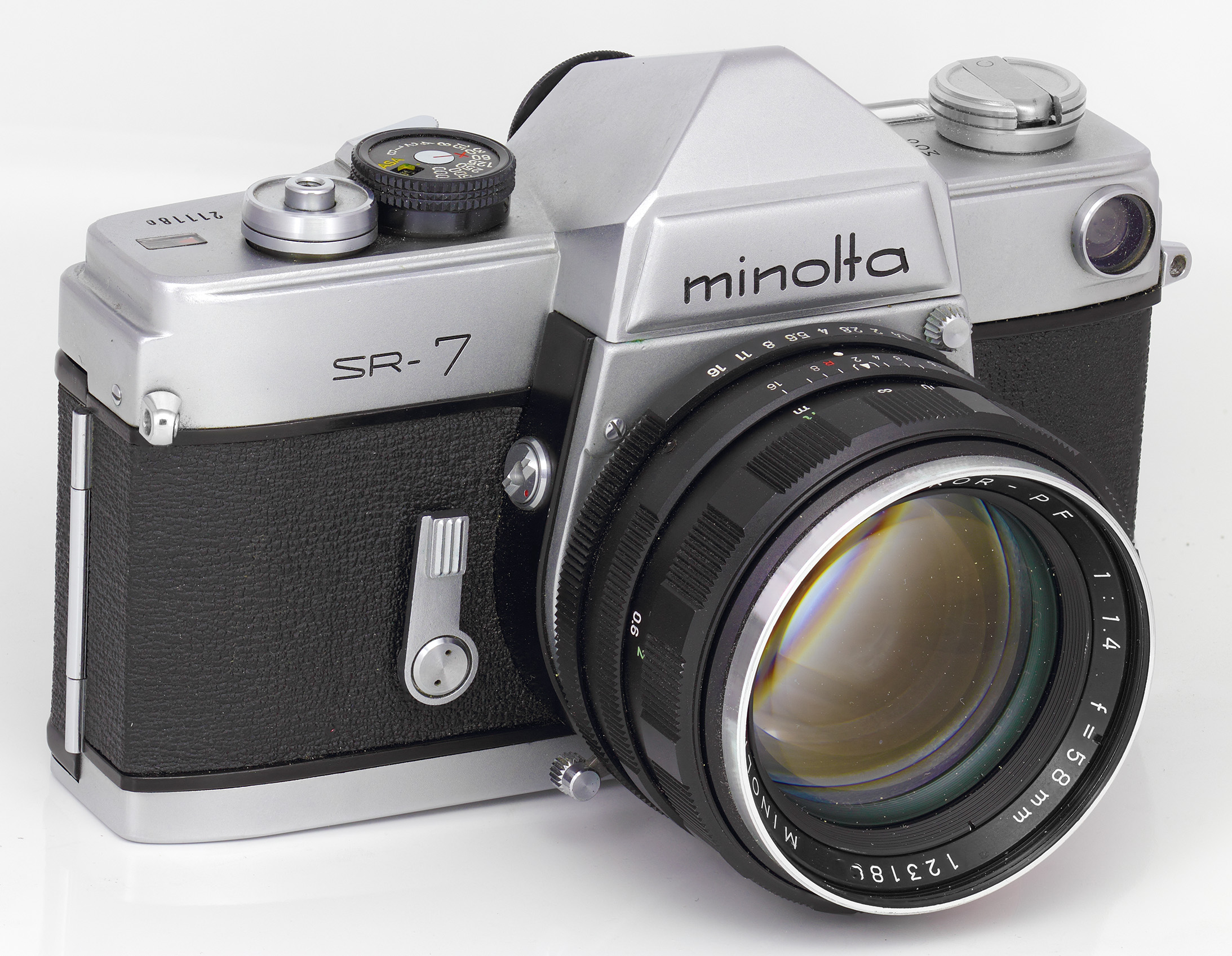
- The Minolta SR-7. Note the externally mounted CdS light meter on the right side.

Overview
- Maker: Minolta
- Type: 35 mm SLR

Lens
- Lens mount: Minolta SR

Sensor/medium
- Film speed: ISO 25 to 6400 [manual]

Focusing
- Focus: Manual

Exposure/metering
- Exposure: Manual
- Exposure metering: EV1 to EV17 @ ASA 100

Flash
- Flash: PC socket
- Flash synchronization: 1/60 s

Shutter
- Frame rate: Manual lever winding, unmodified.
- Shutter speed range: 1 s to 1/1000 s

General
- Battery: PX625, 1.3 V mercury battery
- Dimensions: 146×95×91 mm (5.7×3.7×3.6 in)
- Weight: 990 g (35 oz)m
- Made in: Japan

The Minolta SR-7 is a 35 mm single-lens reflex camera (SLR) made by Minolta, produced from 1962 to 1966. It is notable for being the first SLR camera with a built in CdS light meter.

It is a fully mechanical camera - batteries are needed only to power the exposure meter. It is powered by a single PX625 battery (now discontinued, Wein Cell 625 batteries are an alternative).

== History ==
In 1958, Minolta's first SLR camera was released, the Minolta SR-2, which employed a semi-automatic diaphragm and an instant return mirror. A year later, in 1959, the Minolta SR-1 was released. Basically a stripped down Minolta SR-2 with shutter speeds reduced to 1/500 of a second rather than the SR-2's 1/1000 of a second. Next came the Minolta SR-3. The camera had an ability to mount a selenium meter, which was then linked to the shutter speed. This particular camera was released in 1960, two years before the release of the SR-7.

The Minolta SR-7 stayed in production from 1962 to 1966, with minor changes in its mechanism and overall construction. Specifically, in the early versions, the meter had no switch to turn itself off, so the owner had to close its leather ever ready case to prevent it from draining batteries. A year later, this was rectified and a switch was added. Mirror lock up function was also improved. In 1965 other changes were made to the camera - it was now squarer than previously, and the viewfinder was slightly changed, with the introduction of the Anglefinder and the Viewfinder Magnifier V.

In late 1966, the SR-T series was introduced. These cameras had through-the-lens metering (TTL) metering, which Minolta called the Contrast Light Compensator (CLC).
