= Minolta XD-7 =

Minolta XD-7 (Minolta XD-11, Minolta XD)
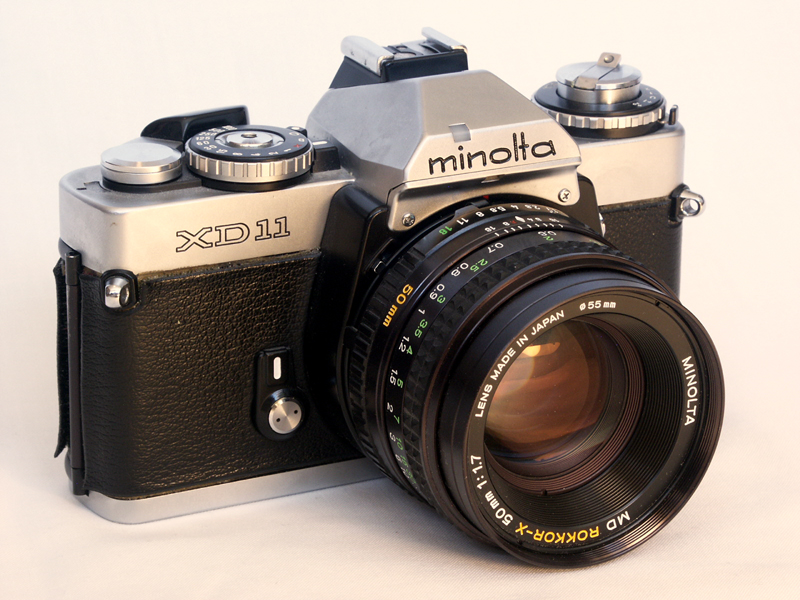
- A chrome Minolta XD-11

Overview
- Maker: Minolta
- Type: 35 mm SLR
- Released: 1977: Minolta XD (Japan), Minolta XD-7 (Europe), Minolta XD-11 (North America); 1979: Minolta XD-S (Japan).
- Production: 1977-1984

Lens
- Lens mount: Minolta SR mount

Sensor/medium
- Film format: 35mm
- Film size: 36 mm x 24 mm

Focusing
- Focus: Manual focus

Exposure/metering
- Exposure: Shutter, Aperture priority autoexposure; manual

Flash
- Flash: Hot shoe and PC terminal

General
- Dimensions: 51×86×136 mm (2.0×3.4×5.4 in), 560 g
- Made in: Japan

The Minolta XD-7 (sold as the XD-11 in North America and as the XD in Japan) is a semi-professional 35mm SLR film camera manufactured by Minolta from 1977 until 1984.

== History ==
The Minolta XD/XD-7/XD-11 was developed in collaboration with Leica, and its design influenced the Leica R4. Marketed in 1977, it was sold in Europe as the XD-7, in North America as the XD-11, and in Japan as the XD. It was avalaible in two versions, one chrome and one black. It was Minolta's first SLR camera to feature both shutter priority and aperture priority automatic exposure modes, as well as a program automatic mode, albeit not described as such on the camera or in the manual. The camera also offered fully metered manual exposure as well as depth of field preview and an eyepiece shutter. Also, included were fully mechanical "O" (1/100 sec) and bulb settings, which allowed it to operate without a battery. The XD-7 was the top-of-the-line Minolta camera when it was in production and retains a reputation for quality. It was Minolta's last metal-bodied SLR design before the company switched to plastic with the X-700.

There was also a less-expensive version of the XD-7 called the XD-5. Introduced in 1979, the XD-5 was mostly identical to the XD-7 but without some higher-end features like the eyepiece shutter or the display of the selected shutter speed in the viewfinder in manual exposure mode. A black variant with a viewfinder diopter instead of the eyepiece shutter called the XD-S was also offered in Japan.

Many professional photographers have used the XD-7. One of the best known is Harry Benson, who often acknowledged the XD-7 in the various photography books he published in the 1980s.

== Specifications ==
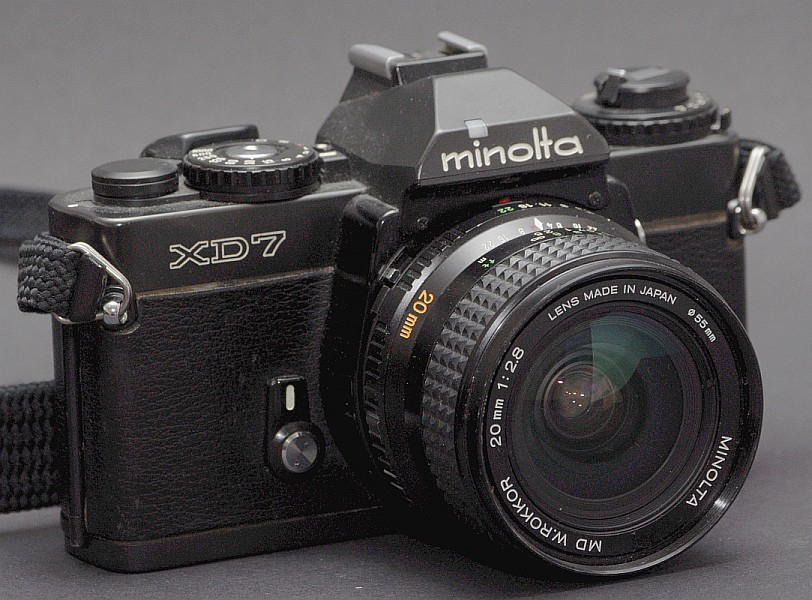
Black Minolta XD7

- Exposure range of EV 1 to EV 18 (ISO 100 and f1.4).
- Exposure correction from -2 to +2 EV.
- Minolta SR lens mount
- Flash sync at hot shoe or terminal at 1/100s.
- Electronic vertical-travel metal shutter with electromagnetic release.
- Mechanical shutter mode available at 1/100s.
- Shutter speeds of 1s to 1/1000s plus bulb setting.
- Stepless control of shutter speeds in aperture-priority auto-exposure mode.
- TTL center-weighted metering (silicon diode).
- 94% viewfinder coverage.
- Acute Matte focusing screen with split-image bi-prism surrounded by microprisms. Four screens available, replaced by technician.
- 0.87x viewfinder magnification.
- Viewfinder information depends on operating mode:
  - In aperture priority, shutter speed is indicated by LEDs.
  - In shutter priority, aperture is indicated by LEDs.
  - In manual mode, recommended shutter speed is indicated by LEDs. The chosen shutter speed is shown in a separate window.
  - With Minolta X-type flashes, flash-ready is signaled by blinking over-range LED.
  - Aperture setting is shown in all modes.
- Battery: 2x LR44; 2x SR44 or equivalents; or one CR1/3N.
- Mechanical self-timer.
- Depth of field preview.
- Film memo holder.
- Safe-load signal indicating film present and correctly spooled.
- Film advance release allowing multiple exposures.
- Motorized film advance possible with Minolta Auto Winder D.

== Sources ==
- Hands, Antony. "The XD Series". Rokkorfiles.
- Foo, Leo. "Modern Classic SLR Series: The Minolta XD-7 (XD-11) - The First Multimode 35mm AE SLR". Photography in Malaysia.
