= Minolta X-700 =

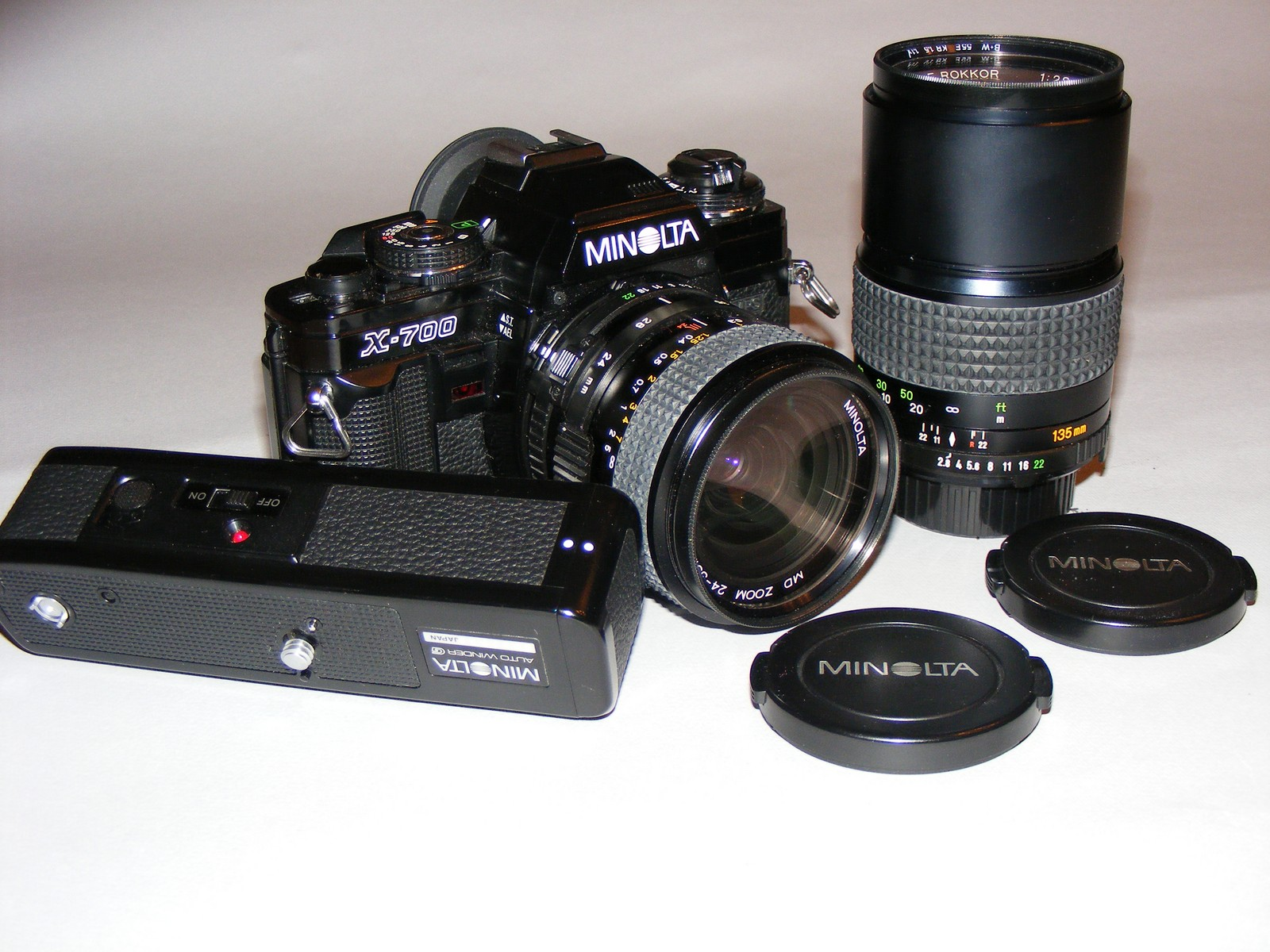
- Minolta X-700 black version

Overview
- Maker: Minolta
- Type: 35mm SLR camera
- Released: 1981
- Production: 1981-1999

Lens
- Lens mount: Minolta SR mount

Sensor/medium
- Film format: 35mm

Focusing
- Focus: Manual

Exposure/metering
- Exposure: Aperture priority, Program, Manual and Bulb

Flash
- Flash: hot shoe and PC terminal

Shutter
- Frame rate: Up to 2 frames per second when fitted with Auto Winder-G winder or up to 3.5 frames per second when fitted with MD-1 motor drive.

General
- Dimensions: 51.5×89×137 mm (2.03×3.50×5.39 in), 505g

The Minolta X-700 is a 35 mm single-lens reflex film camera introduced by Minolta in 1981. It was the top model of their final manual-focus SLR series before the introduction of the auto-focus Minolta Maxxum 7000.

== Features ==
The X-700 used the basic body of the XG-M with electronically controlled stepless speeds, but added full program autoexposure in addition to the XG-M's aperture priority and metered manual modes. This program mode was referred to as "MPS" or Minolta Program System.

It also introduced through-the-lens (TTL) off the film flash metering in Aperture Priority or Program mode, which adjusted exposure and flash output automatically to produce a perfect exposure, without the user having to adjust anything at all, and added exposure lock and interchangeable focusing screens to the XG-M's features. The X-700 was aimed to appeal to the widest range of photographers possible. Its easy-to-use, fully automated Program mode could turn it into a point-and-shoot that anybody could use, but its wide array of advanced features and available accessories and lenses made it appealing to professionals alike.

Minolta later launched various other models based on the X-700 chassis: X-300 (X-370 for the North American market), X-300S, X-300N, X-500 (X-570 for the North American market) and X-600. The X-500 (X-570 in the North American market) lacked the X-700's program exposure mode and exposure compensation dial, but addressed one of the main complaints of X-700 users: the X-700 in fully manual mode only showed the recommended shutter speed by the meter in the viewfinder. This meant that to actually see what shutter speed was selected, the user had to take their eye off the viewfinder. Despite it being a small detail, many photographers preferred the X-500/570 which in fully manual mode showed both the recommended shutter speed and the selected one in the viewfinder. The X-500/570 also offered slower flash sync speeds than 1/60 of a second. The X-300 also released in 1983 was the most basic model of X-series bodies. It lacked TTL flash metering, program exposure mode and the depth of field preview button, and it did not display the f-stop-setting of the lens in the viewfinder. Basic parts of all three cameras, such as the shutter, viewfinder, mirror system, and light metering system, were identical.

Motivated by the huge success of the low-priced Canon AE-1 and other consumer-level cameras, Minolta followed suit in the new camera's design by offering a wide array of optional equipment, with the X-700 being the base of the "Minolta Program System" such as flashes, film winders, motor drives, data backs, multi function backs, power grips, wireless controllers etc. This lowered the budget for the camera's internal mechanism. In a step backwards, the new X-700 was not equipped with the fast vertical metal shutter of previous XE and XD cameras, and was instead fitted with a less expensive horizontal traverse silk shutter, enabling maximum sync speed of 1/60 second, and operated by an electromagnetic shutter release. No mechanical shutter speed was provided, even in bulb mode. The resultant battery drain and inability to meter at light levels below EV-1 made the camera a poor choice for long exposures, as often needed for astrophotography. Minolta further lowered the price of the camera by fabricating certain parts in the film advance and rewind mechanism of less expensive materials, such as plastic, and by the use of less expensive electronic components.

== History ==
In 1982, the X-700 was awarded the European "Camera of the Year". Its competitive pricing resulted in its becoming the most successful Minolta camera since the SRT line.

In 1985 Minolta came out with their first autofocus cameras with the Maxxum / Alpha / Dynax series of cameras.

In 1999, after 18 years in production, the X-700 was discontinued.

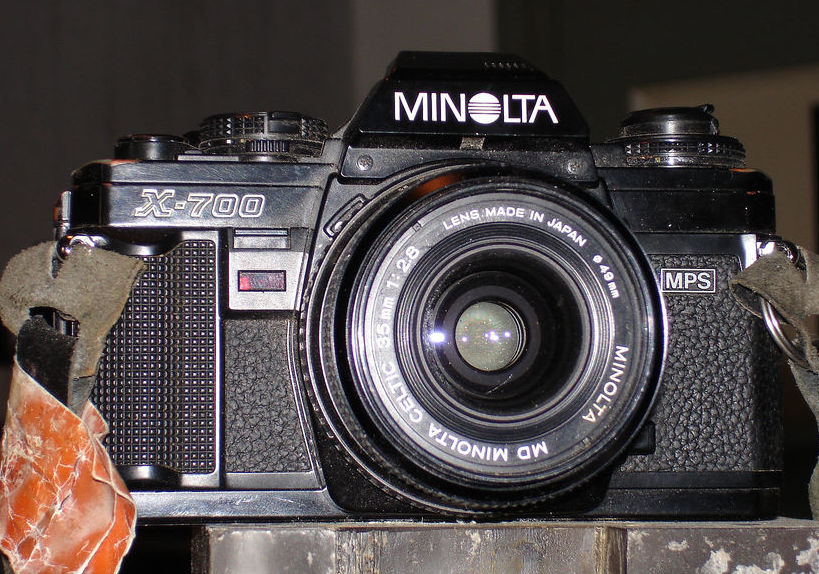
Black version.

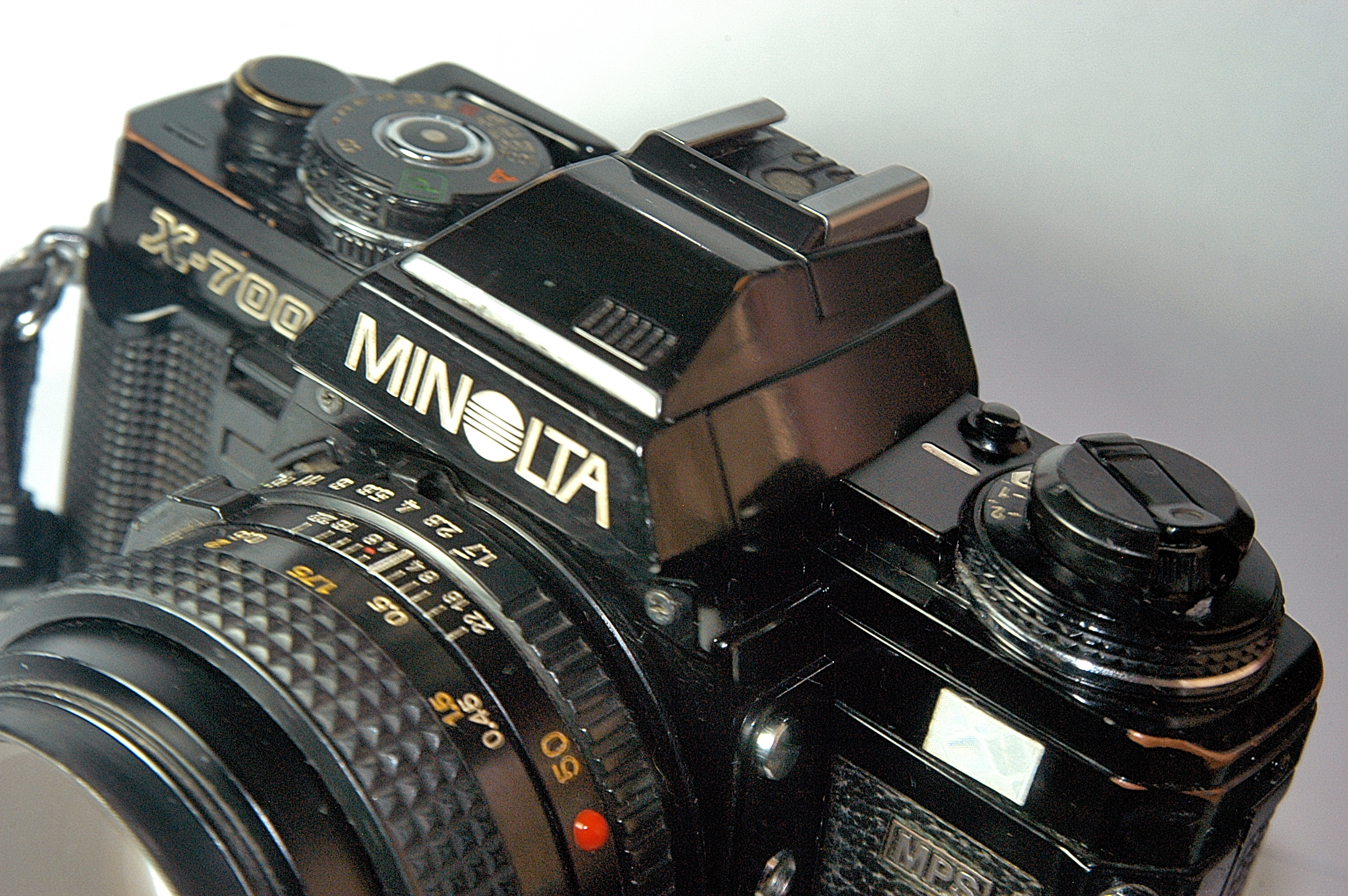
Black version and details.

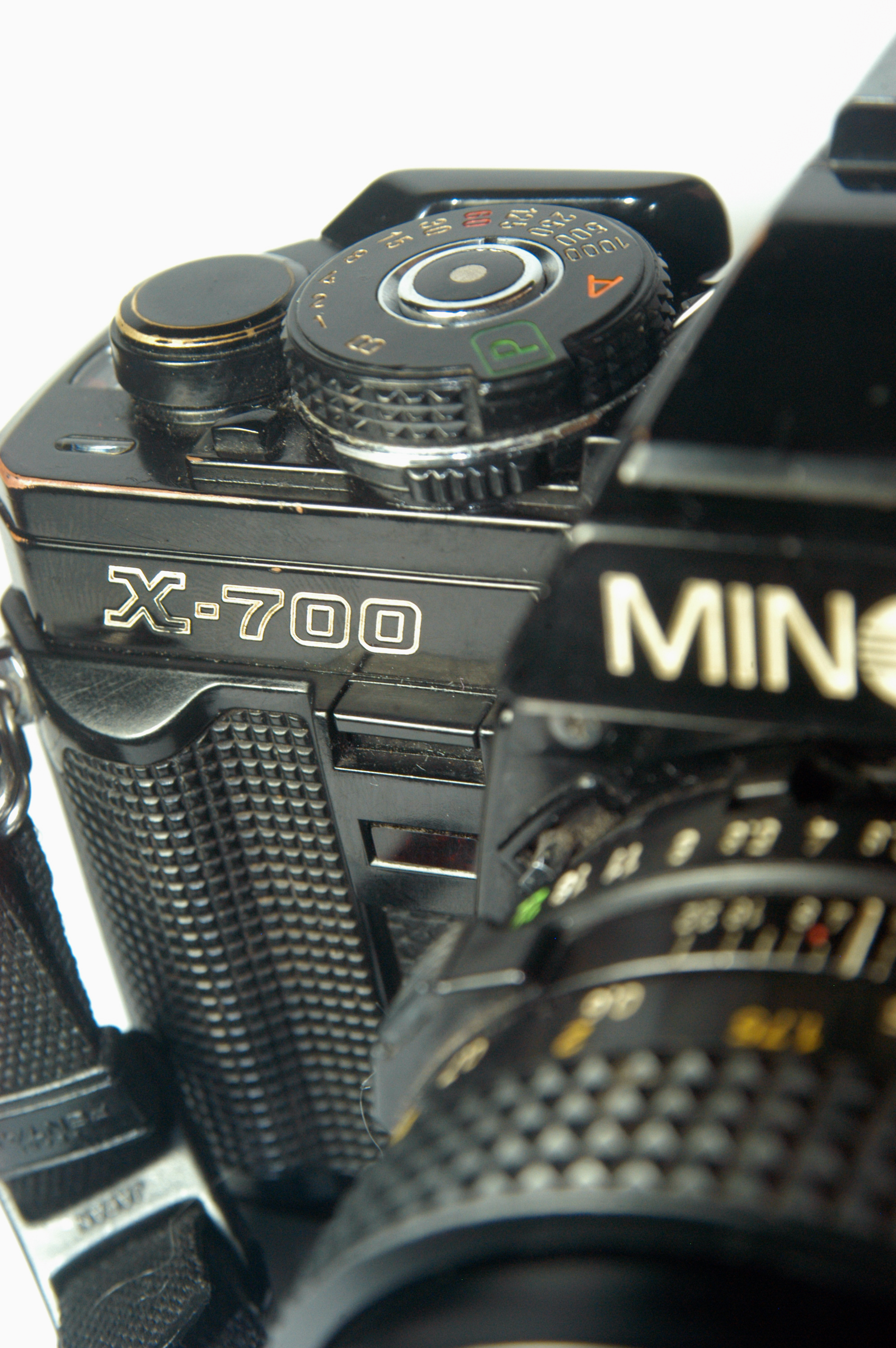
Black version and details.

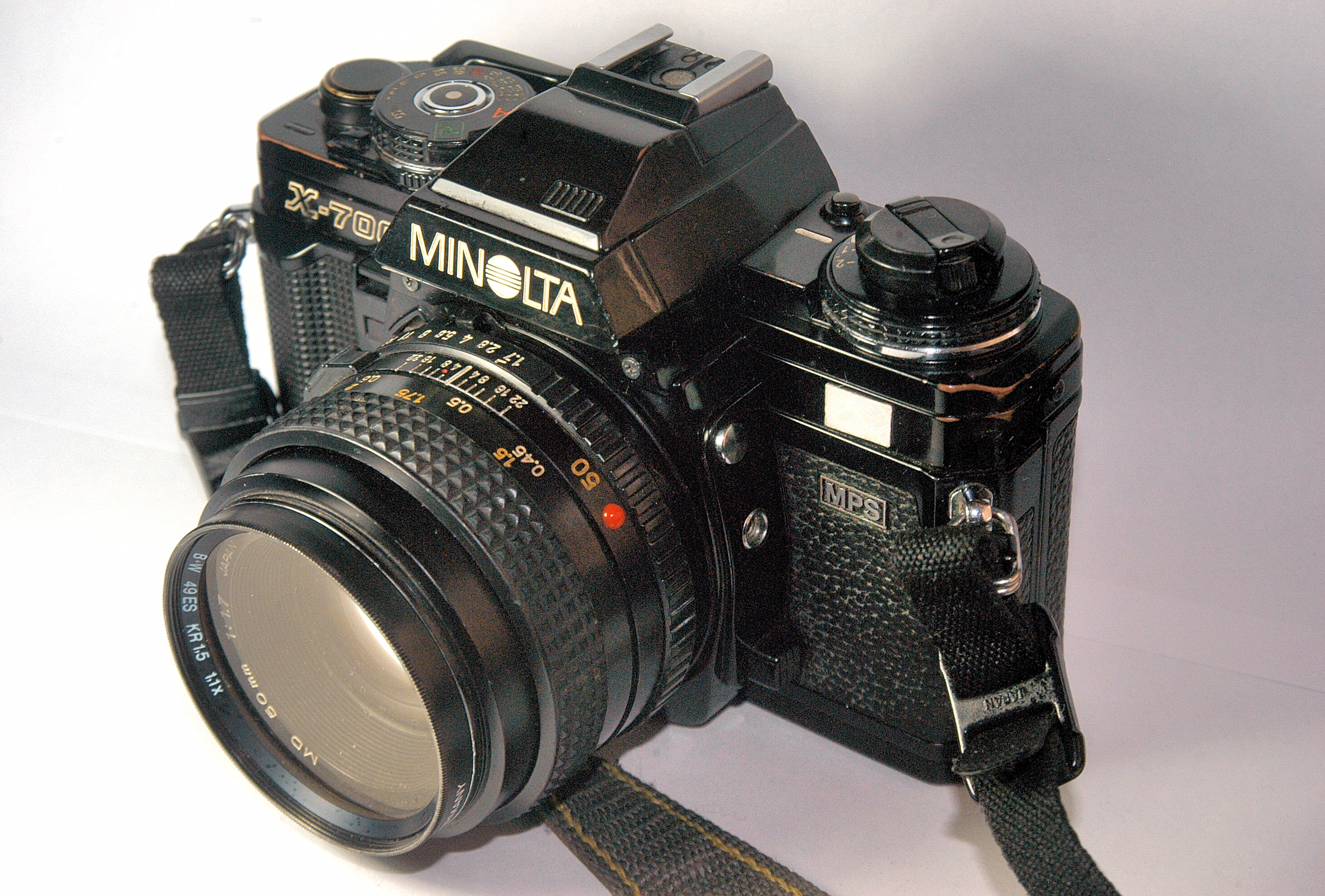
Black version complete with MD lens 50mm f/1.7.

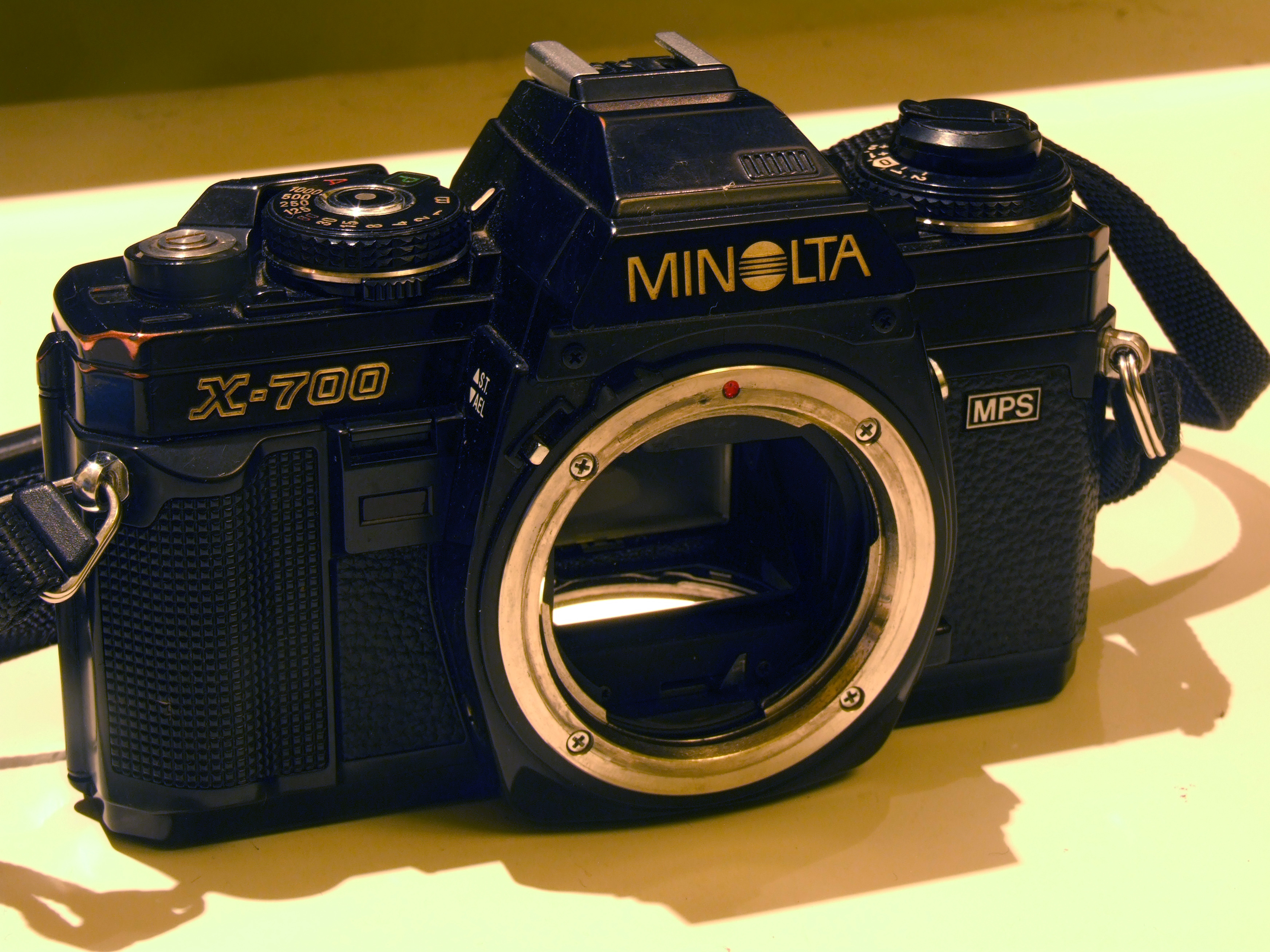
Black version.

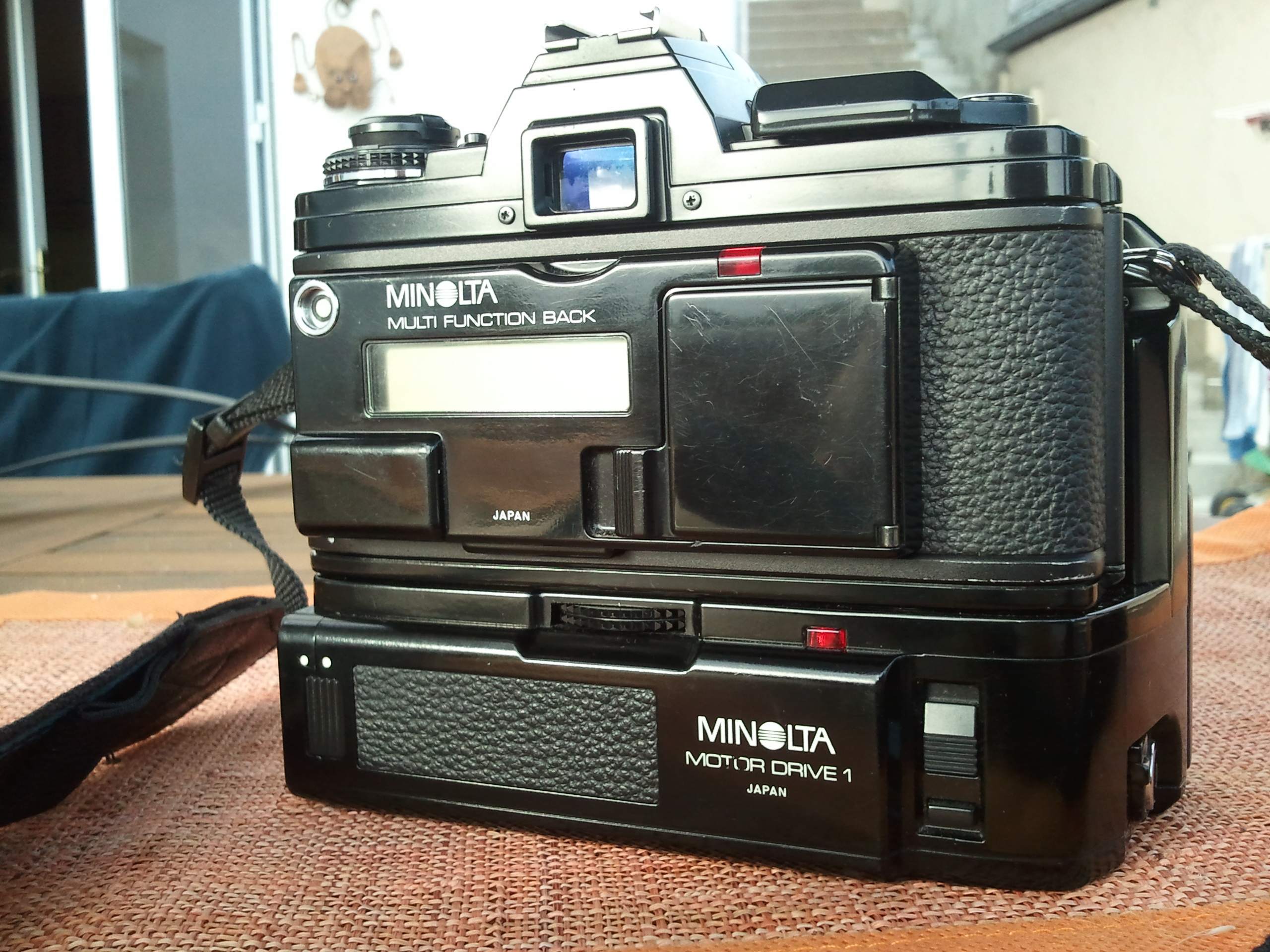
Digital date back accessory and motor drive, imprinting negatives with time and date of exposure, and permitting timed interval exposure.

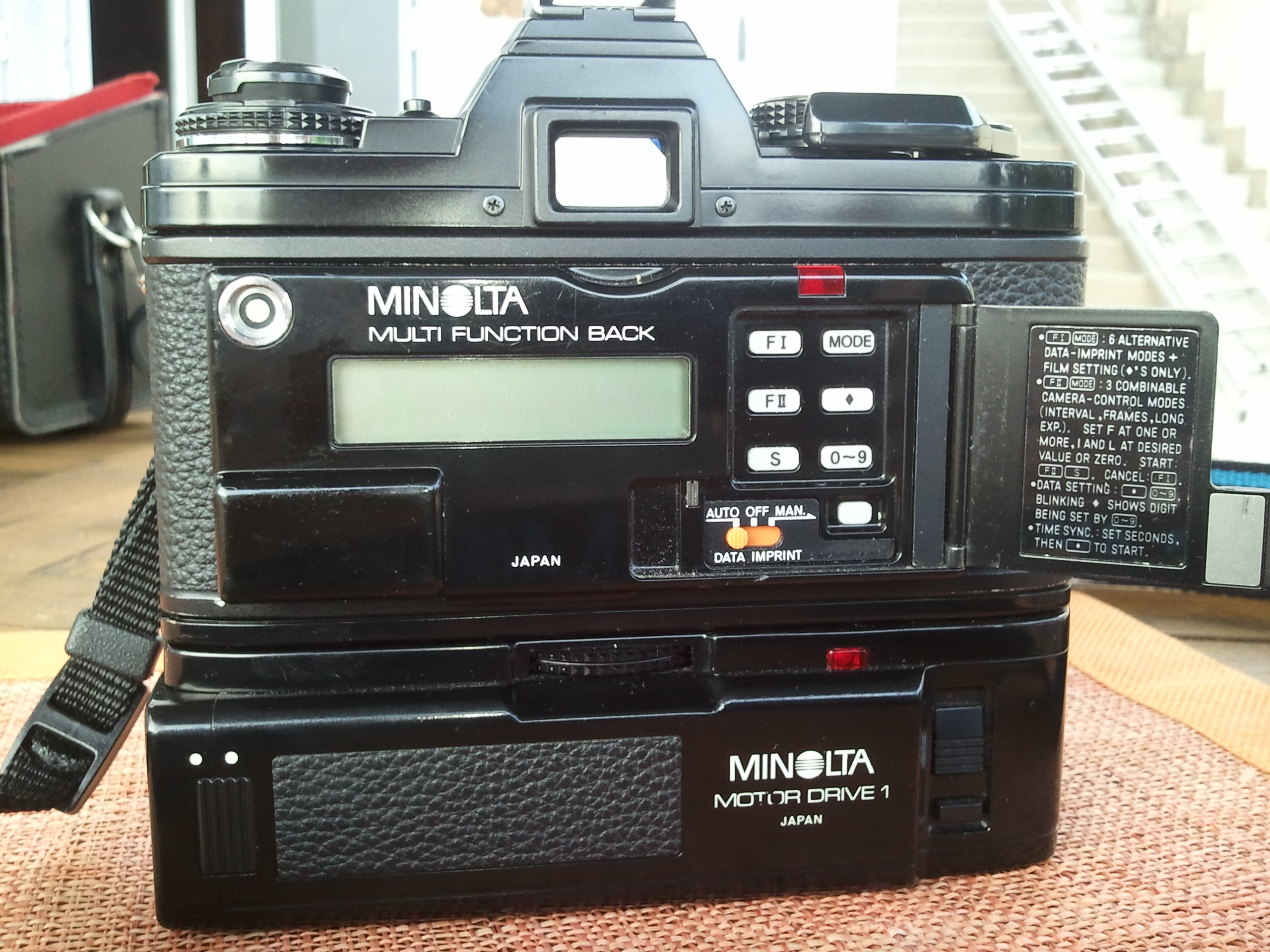
Digital date back accessory, buttons exposed.

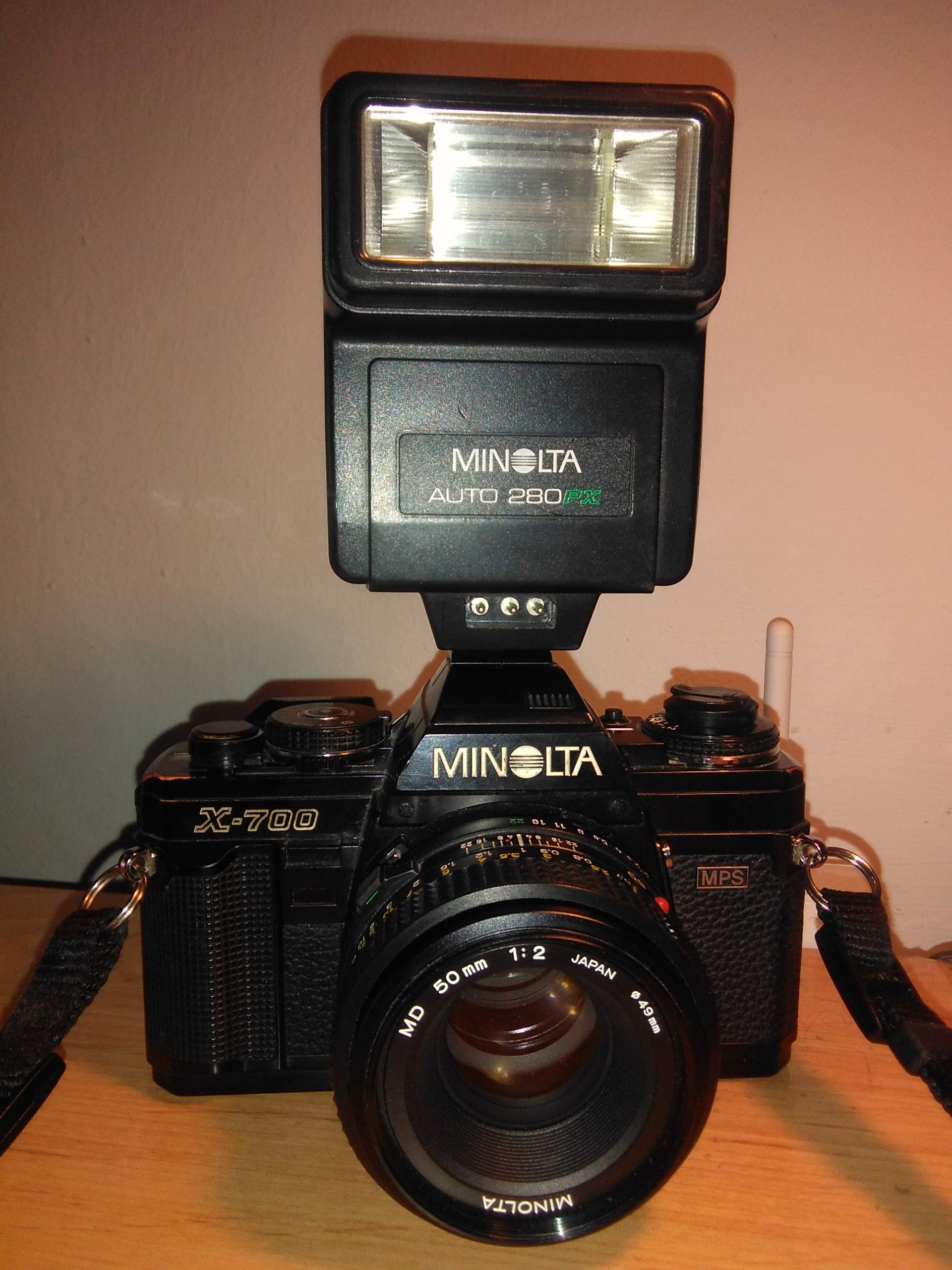
Minolta X-700 with Auto 280-PX flash

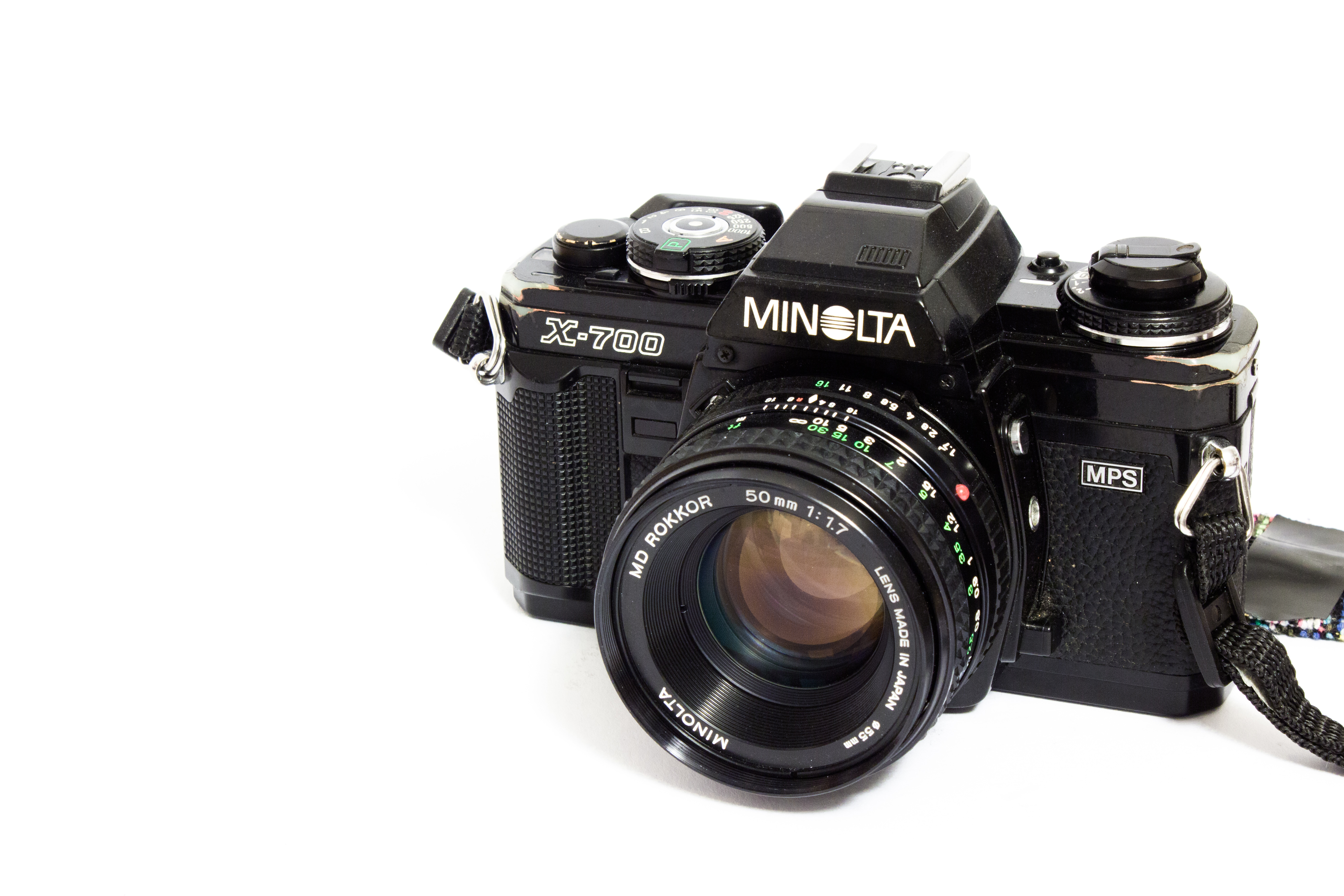
Minolta x700 with 50mm Rokkor f1.7

== Bibliography ==
- Rokkor, Antony (2006-04-26). X-700. The Rokkor Files, 26 April 2006. Retrieved on 2005-11-27 from http://www.rokkorfiles.com/X-700.html.
- German instruction. Minolta X-700. Retrieved from https://web.archive.org/web/20100708160813/http://www.design-weblounge.de/kameras-filme/minolta-x-700/.
