= Minolta X-570 =

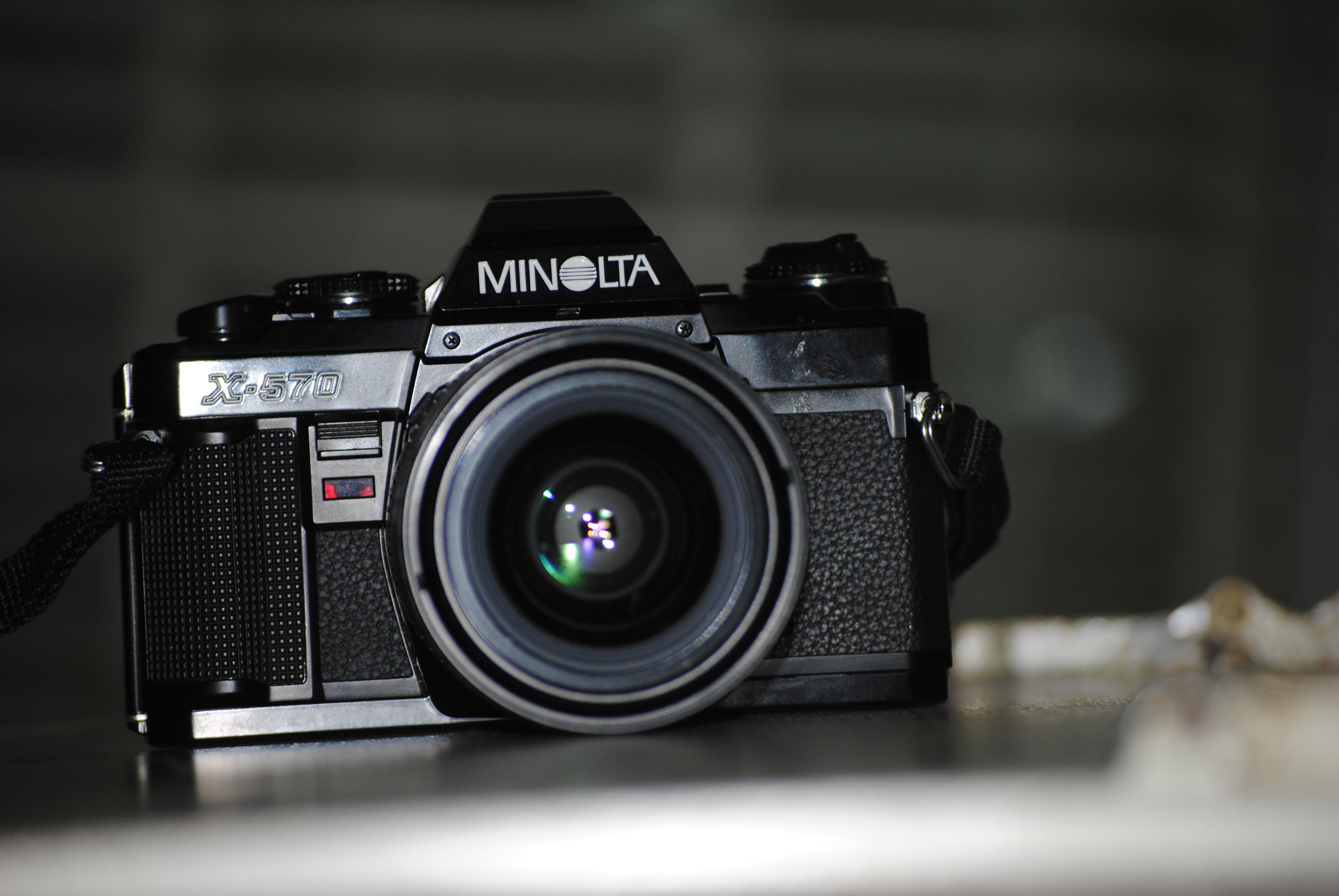

Overview
- Type: 35mm SLR camera

Lens
- Lens mount: Minolta SR mount

Focusing
- Focus: Manual

Exposure/metering
- Exposure: Manual aperture, manual or automatic shutter speed

Flash
- Flash: Hot shoe

The Minolta X-570 (X-500 in Europe) is a film single-lens reflex camera. It was introduced in 1983 as a lower cost alternative to the X-700. It used the same chassis as the rest of the Minolta X series and the standard Minolta SR mount. The primary difference between the top-of-the-line X-700 and the X-570 is that the latter lacked the fully automatic Program exposure mode. However, the X-570 added an important feature that would be part of all subsequent X series cameras, but never added to the X-700, a match LED exposure meter. This system indicated the selected shutter speed with a blinking LED and the suggested shutter speed, based on the exposure value and the selected lens aperture, with a solid LED. Some consider the X-500 more of an enthusiast's camera than the X-700, since it offered no P mode and therefore required some photographic knowledge.

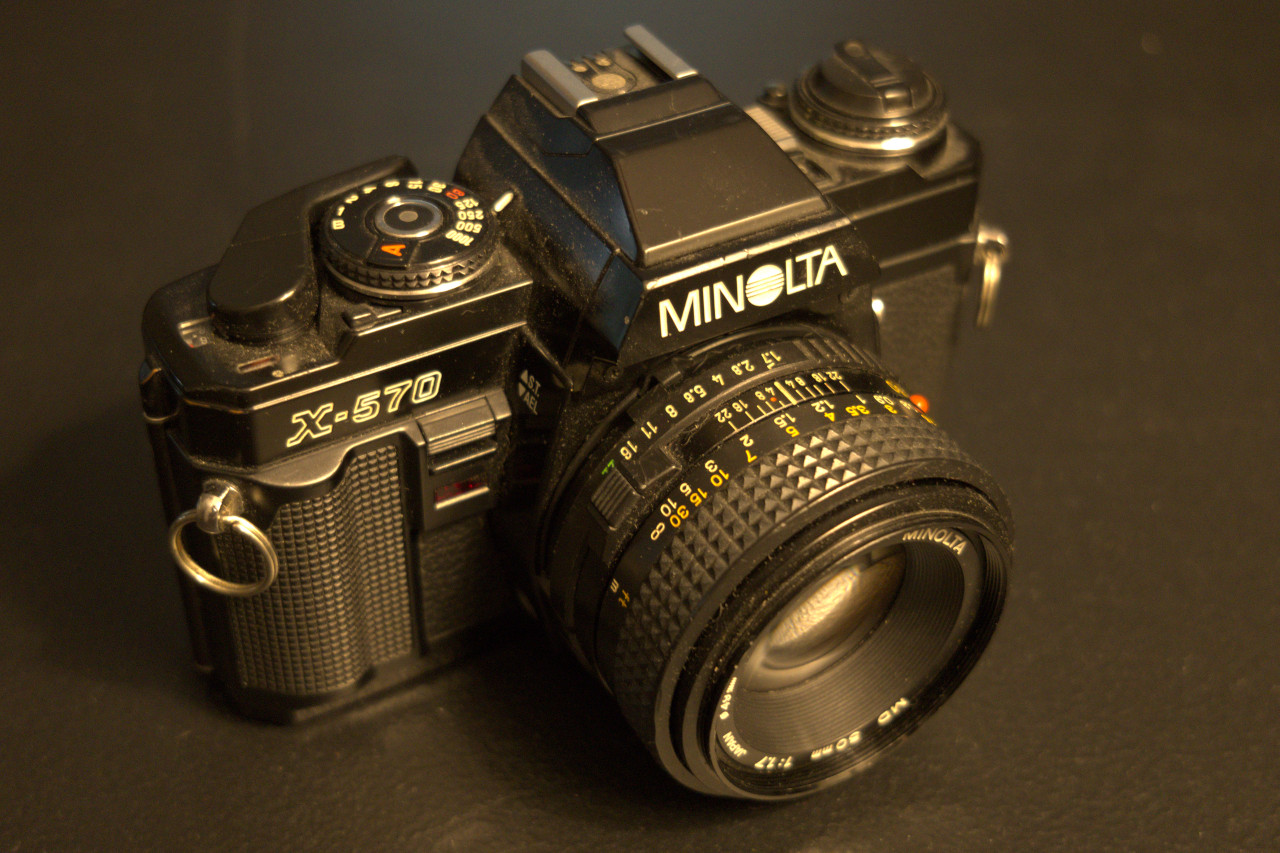
Minolta X-570 SLR with 50mm lens

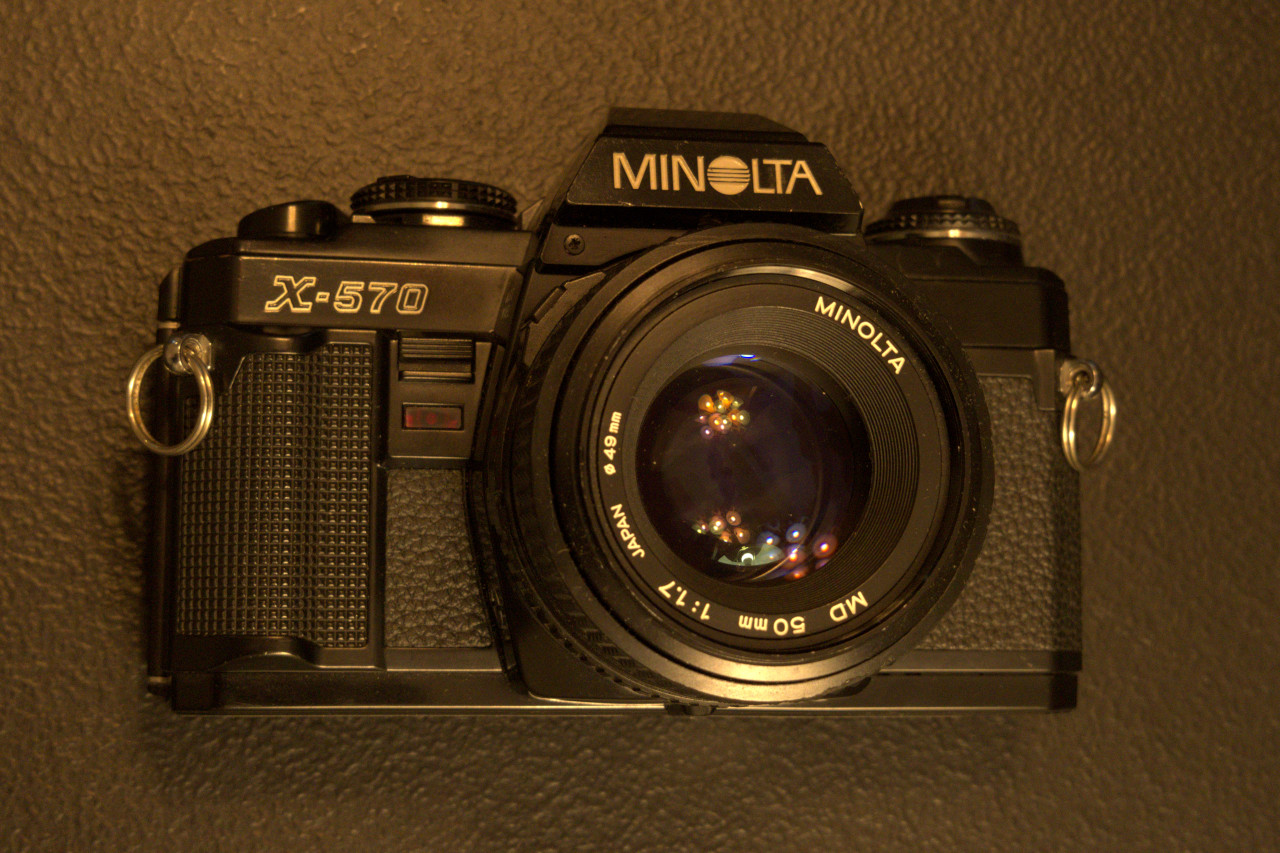
Minolta X-570 SLR with 50mm lens
