= Minolta XG-M =

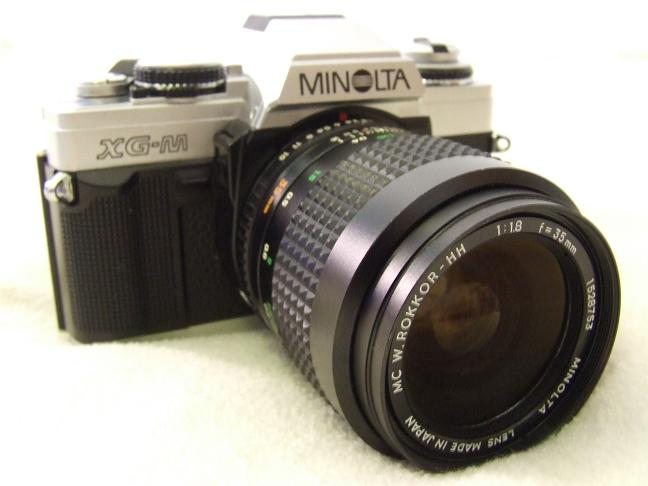

Overview
- Type: 35mm SLR

Lens
- Lens mount: Minolta SR mount

Focusing
- Focus: Manual focus

Exposure/metering
- Exposure: Aperture priority autoexposure

Flash
- Flash: Hot shoe and PC socket

Shutter
- Shutter: Leica-type dual-curtain focal-plane shutter

General
- Dimensions: 52 × 89 × 138 mm, 515 g (without lens or batteries)

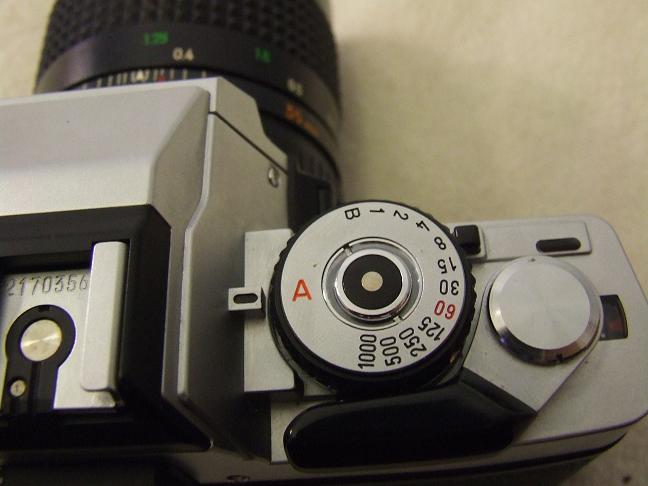
Top view.

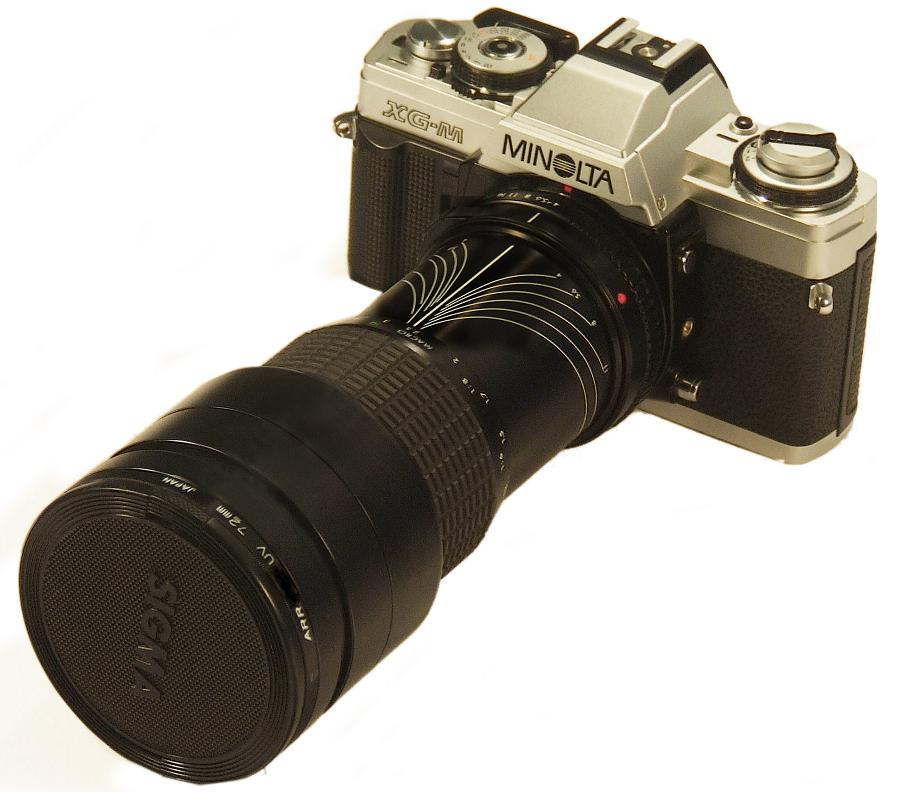
Camera Fitted with an after-market zoom lens

The Minolta XG-M was a 35mm single-lens reflex camera introduced in 1981 by Minolta of Japan. It was also known as the X-70 on the Japanese market, in which it was not available until 1982. When released, it was the top model in Minolta's XG series of consumer-grade manual focus SLRs, replacing the XG-9. Changes from that model included a metered manual mode (the XG-9's meter was switched off in manual), and a revised body style with rearranged controls. This was also the first camera to use Minolta's new logo, which was used until the 2003 merger into Konica Minolta.

The body style became Minolta's standard manual-focus SLR body, so the XG-M strongly resembles subsequent Minolta cameras.

Body changes from the XG-9 included a new right hand handgrip and stronger internal build allowing the use of a 3.5fps motor drive while the XG bodies were only able to use a 2fps winder.

The XG-9's integrated switch for on/off/self-timer/battery check was removed and its functions spread around the camera. The self timer was relocated to a switch on the front of the camera, on the left-hand side of the mirror housing. A new main on-off switch was placed beneath the shutter speed dial. The lock button for the shutter speed dial also functioned as a battery check; the front LED, also used for the self-timer, lit when that button was pressed and the batteries held adequate charge. Film speed and exposure compensation settings were moved to beneath the rewind knob.

The XG-M supported both aperture priority autoexposure and full manual mode. For aperture priority shooting, the shutter speed dial was set to the A (auto) position. The photographer would set the aperture on the lens, which would be visible in the viewfinder by means of a small periscope beneath the image. The camera would decide on the correct shutter speed according to the reading of its center-weighted average metering. This would be displayed in the viewfinder: a column on the right of the image showed all the shutter speeds, and an LED would light next to the chosen speed. The automatically selected exposure could be adjusted by means of the exposure compensation dial on the left; compensation of plus or minus 2 stops could be selected in half-stop increments.

In manual mode, the XG-M would use that LED to display its recommended shutter speed. However, to select a shutter speed, the camera had to be removed from the eye; the speed selected was not shown in the viewfinder. Speeds between 1 second and 1/1000 second could be chosen, and there was a BULB mode for long-duration exposures.

The camera was battery dependent, needing 2 LR44 or equivalent button cells to operate.

A minimal amount of photographic flash automation was provided. With a compatible dedicated flash, the camera would be set automatically to the 1/60 second X-sync speed, and a ready light in the viewfinder would blink when the flash was charged. The photographer did have to set the correct aperture for flash photography according to subject distance; a guide was available on the back of Minolta's flashes.
