= Minolta SR-2 =

35mm SLR camera

Minolta SR-2 c.1958
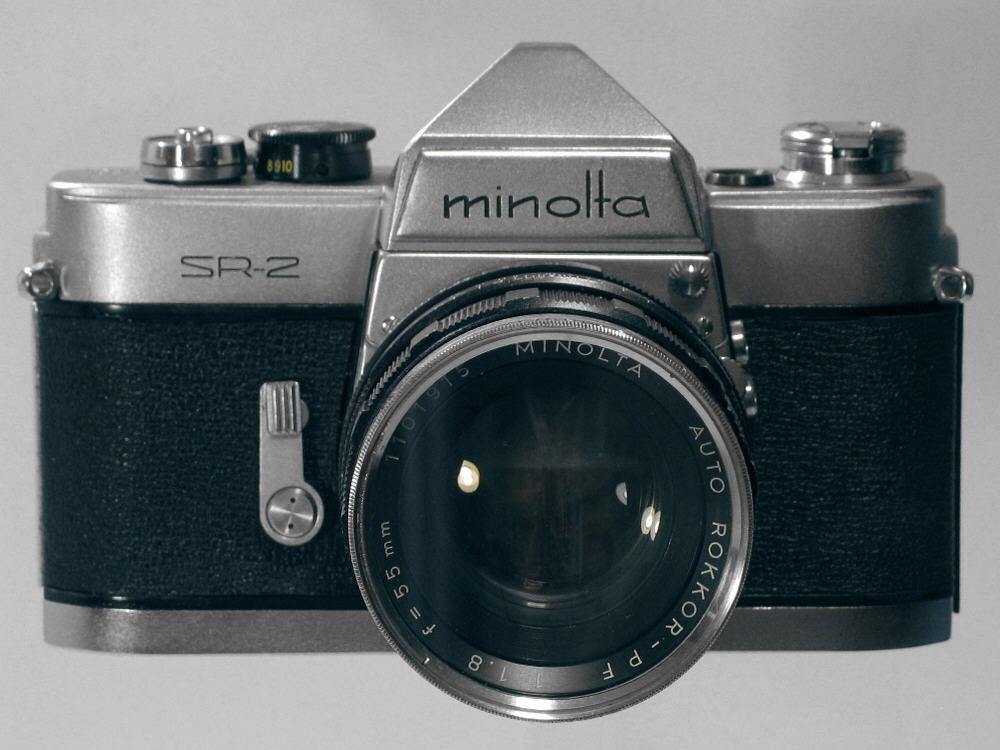

Overview
- Maker: Minolta
- Type: 35mm SLR camera

Lens
- Lens mount: Minolta SR

The Minolta SR-2 was presented in 1958 as the first 35mm SLR camera from Chiyoda Kogaku. Popular cameras of this type at that time were mainly from Europe but a few from Japan, including the Asahi Pentax, the Miranda T and the Topcon R. The miniature SLR camera concept was conceived in the 1930s at Ihagee in Dresden, resulting in the 1936 Kine Exakta. Influential cameras designs like that of the 1939 KW Praktiflex, the 1949 ZI Contax S, and 1952 the KW Praktina marked the steady progress toward a perfected SLR. Several features of the latter seem to have influenced the design of the SR-2 although dissimilar in many respects. The obvious similarities are the stepped top plate, the carrying strap lugs, the self-timer lever and some general body features.

The name Minolta was first used in 1932 on the 4.5×6 format Semi-Minolta using 120 film. The manufacturer was established in November 1928 by Kazuo Tashima (1899-1985) as the Nichidoku Shashinki Shōten (Japan-German Camera Store) together with two Germans living in Japan, but reorganised as a joint stock company named the Molta Goshi Kaisha in the summer of 1931. It is likely that this inspired the name Minolta that later became a registered trade mark. However, in 1937 the company was reorganised as the Chiyoda Kogaku Seikō KK, CHIYOKO for short. Chiyoda Kogaku manufactured leaf shutters and photographic lenses, as well as melting their own optical glasses, an achievement very few camera makers ever have matched. In 1947, the Minolta-35 was launched as the company's first 35mm camera, resulting in a brief range of quite popular rangefinder models lasting until the end of the 1950s. In 1962 the company name was changed to Minolta Camera K.K.

== Description ==
SR-1 and SR-2

Minolta SR-2 top

The Minolta SR-2 is well built and thoroughly constructed; including features that remained characteristic of the Minolta SLR camera range to follow until the advent of the auto focus cameras in the 1980s. The main features are a single stroke wind-on lever; an instant return mirror and a sturdy three-pronged bayonet lens mount with an internal automatic aperture stop-down mechanism. This mount is the earliest example of a modern 35mm SLR bayonet lens mount, used throughout the entire lifespan of the Minolta manual focus camera area. The automatic aperture mechanism on this camera does not reopen the aperture after exposure, a feature at the time regarded as unnecessary, since the darkened finder might indicate the camera not being made ready for the next exposure. The SR-2 was joined a year later by the budget model SR-1, and was replaced in 1960 by the improved SR-3. This range was complemented by an increasing selection of high quality Minolta SR mount Rokkor lenses, within a few years ranging from 35mm to 600mm, and an RF 800mm f8 mirror lens in 1960, some of these even multicoated from the very start.

The characteristic features of the Minolta SR-2

- Camera body with fixed pentaprism finder with Fresnel lens for even brightness.
- Reflex finder mirror flips up and returns instantly after exposure.
- Hinged strong back with double light traps for simple and safe film loading.
- 45mm wide throated three-pronged bayonet lens mount.
- Lens diaphragm closes automatically to the preset aperture and opens on winding on.
- Wind-on lever makes camera ready in one quick operation for continuous shooting.
- Shutter release is situated in the hub of the wind-on lever.
  Light Value numerals
- Focal plane shutter with speeds from 1 to 1/1000 second and B set on a single stationary dial.
- Automatic frame counter placed under a magnifying glass, which resets when opening the back.
- X and PF flash synchronization contacts with separate PC sockets.
- Self-timer with separate release button.
- Combined folding crank rewind knob and back door opener.
- Rewind release button on the camera base.
- Secondary yellow LV (Light value) numerals engraved on the aperture ring and the shutter speed dial; the sum of the set pair of values ads up to the required LV number.
  Film type reminder dial on the back
- ASA / DIN film type reminder dial on the back.

The Rokkor lenses for the SR-2

- W.Rokkor-HG 1:2.8 35mm (1958)
- Auto W.Rokkor-HG 1:2.8 f=35mm (1959)
- Auto Rokkor-PF 1:1.8 f=55mm (1958)
- Auto Rokkor-PF 1:2 f=55mm (1959)
- Lenses (135 & 35mm) and accessories
  Tele Rokkor-QE 1:3.5 f=100mm (1958)
- Auto Tele Rokkor-QE 1:3.5 f=100mm (1959)
- Tele Rokkor PG 1:2.8 f=135mm (1958)
- Auto Tele Rokkor-PG 1:2.8 f=135mm (1959)
- Tele Rokkor-PF 1:2.5 f=180mm (1959)
- Auto Tele Rokkor-QF 1:3.5 f=200mm (1959)
- Tele Rokkor-QF 1:4 f=250mm (1959)
- Tele Rokkor-TD 1:5.6 f=600mm (1959).
