= List of Minolta products =

List of products manufactured by electronics company Minolta.

== Cameras ==
=== 16 mm film cameras ===
- Minolta 16 series

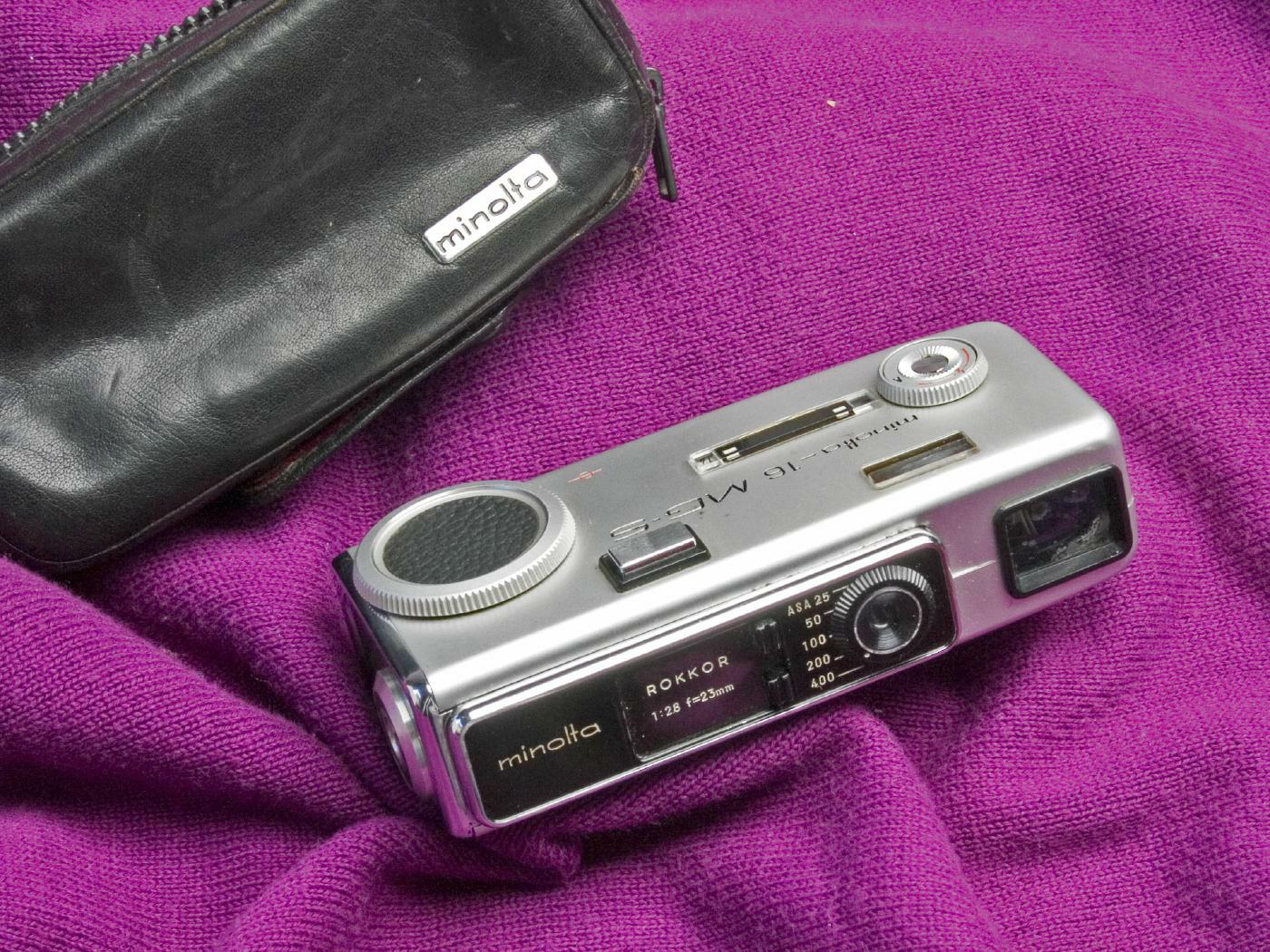
Minolta16 Minikamera

=== 110 film cameras ===
- Minolta 110 Zoom SLR
- Minolta 110 Zoom SLR Mark ii
- Minolta Autopak pocket camera
- Minolta Weathermatic A (bright yellow waterproof case)

=== 126 film cameras ===
- Minolta Autopak 400X
- Minolta Autopak 500
- Minolta Autopak 550
- Minolta Autopak 600X
- Minolta Autopak 700
- Minolta Autopak 800

=== 35 mm rangefinder and viewfinder cameras ===
- Minolta 35
- Minolta Hi-Matic series
- Minoltina (S and P)
- Minolta repo (Half frame 35mm)
- Minolta 24 Rapid (Square format 35mm)
- Leica CL (Also sold as the Leitz Minolta CL)
- Minolta CLE
- Minolta TC-1
- Minolta AF-C
- Minolta Uniomat

=== 35 mm SLRs ===
Manual focus (SR, SR-T and X series):

- Minolta SR-2 (1958-1960)
- Minolta SR-1 (variants 1959, 1960, 1961, 1962, 1963, 1965) (1959-1971)
- Minolta SR-3 (variants 1960, 1961) (1960-1962)
- Minolta SR-7 (variants 1962, 1963, 1965) (1962-1966) / Minolta SR 777 (prototype 1965)
- Minolta SR-1s (1967-?)
- Minolta SRM (1970-1975) (Integral motor 3.5 fps with battery handle)
- Minolta SR-T 101 (variants 1966, 1969, 1971) (1966-1975)
- Minolta SR-T 100 (variants 1970, 1971) (1970-1975)
- Minolta SR-T 102 / SR-T 303 / SR-T Super (1973-1975)
- Minolta SR-T SC (1973-1975) (exclusively sold by Sears)
- Minolta SR-T MC (1973-1975) (exclusively sold by J.C. Penney)
- Minolta SR-T 201 / SR-T 101b / SR 101 / SR 101s (1975-1977)
- Minolta SR-T 202 / SR-T 303b / SR 505 (1975-1977)
- Minolta SR-T 200 (variants 1975, 1977, 1978, 1979) (1975-1981) / SR-T 100b (1975-1977), SR-T 100x (1977–81)
- Minolta SR-T 202 / SR-T 303b / SR 505s (1977)
- Minolta SR-T 101b / SR-T 201 / SR 101s (1977, 1978, 1979)
- Minolta SR-T SC-II (1977-1980) (exclusively sold by Sears)
- Minolta SR-T MC-II (1977-1980) (exclusively sold by JCPenney and K-Mart in the U.S., and K-Mart only in Europe)
- Minolta Ritz SR-T 201 (1978)
- Minolta XK / XM / X-1 (variants 1972, 1976) (1972-1981), Minolta Ritz XK (1978)
- Minolta XE / XE-1 / XE-7 (1974)
- Minolta XE-5 / XEb (1975)
- Minolta XK Motor / XM Motor / X-1 Motor (1976)
- Minolta XG 7 / XG 2 / XG-E (variants 1977, 1978)
- Minolta XD 5 (variants 1977, 1979)
- Minolta XD 7 / XD 11 / XD (variants 1977, 1978, 1979, 1980, 1981) (1977-1984), XD 11 Medical (variants 1980, 1981)
- Minolta XG-SE (1978)
- Minolta XG 1 (1978-1981)
- Minolta XG 9 / XG-S (1979)
- Minolta XD-s (variants 1980, 1981), XD-s Medical (variants 1980, 1981)
- Minolta X-7 (1980 - 1982)
- Minolta XG-A (1981)
- Minolta XG-M / X-70 (1981)
- Minolta X-700 (1981)
- Minolta XG-1(n) (variants 1981, 1982)
- Minolta X-570 / X-500 (1983)
- Minolta X-600 (1983)
- Minolta X-300 / X-370 (1984), Minolta X-7A (1985), Minolta X-370s (1995), Minolta X-300x
- Minolta X-300s (1990), X-370n (1990), X-9 (1990)

==== Autofocus (α/Dynax/Maxxum series) ====
Autofocus (α/Dynax/Maxxum series):

Class	1985	1986	1987	1988	1989	1990	1991	1992	1993	1994	1995	1996	1997	1998	1999	2000	2001	2002	2003	2004	2005	2006
Higher flagship	9000 AF							9xi						9/9Ti								
Higher flagship																7						
Higher flagship																	7 Limited					
Lower flagship													800si									
Enthusiast	7000 AF				7000i																	
Enthusiast							8000i															
Enthusiast							7xi															
Enthusiast									700si													
Higher entry-Level		5000			5000i																	
Higher entry-Level								5xi														
Higher entry-Level										400si												
Higher entry-Level											500si			505si			5					
Higher entry-Level											600si classic			505si super								
Higher entry-Level																				70/60		
Lower entry-Level
Lower entry-Level					3000i																	
Lower entry-Level							3xi															
Lower entry-Level						2xi																
Lower entry-Level											300si				404si			4				
Lower entry-Level																			3			
Lower entry-Level																				50/40		

Maxxum United States	Dynax European Union	α (Alpha) Japan	Release year
Minolta Maxxum 9000	Minolta 9000 AF	Minolta α-9000	1985-09
Minolta Maxxum 7000 (with and without "crossed XX")	Minolta 7000 AF, 7000 AF "Das Zwei-Millionen-Ding", 7000 AF "transparent"	Minolta α-7000	1985-02
Minolta Maxxum 5000	Minolta 5000 AF	Minolta α-5000	1986
7000i		7700i	1988
3000i		3700i	1988
5000i		5700i	1989
8000i, 8000i Prestige		8700i, 8700i Prestige	1990
7xi		7xi, 7xi Panorama	1991
3xi		3xi, 3xi Panorama	1991
SPxi			1991/1992?
9xi			1992
5xi		5xi, 5xi Panorama	1992
2xi			1992
700si		707si, 707si Japan	1993
400si, 450si Panorama Date, RZ430si	500si	303si	1994
600si Classic, 650si Panorama Date	600si Classic	507si	1995
500si, 500si Super, 550si Panorama Date, RZ530si	500si Super	303si Super	1995
300si, 350si Panorama Date, Panorama Elite, RZ330si	300si	101si	1995
800si		807si	1997
9			1998
XTsi	505si Super	Sweet	1998
HTsi, HTsi Plus	505si		1998
9Ti	9Ti, 9Ti II	9Ti	1999
STsi	404si	Sweet S	1999
QTsi	303si	360si	1999
7			2000
	7 Limited	7 Limited, 7 Limited II, 7 CNM	2001
5, 5 QD		Sweet II	2001
4	3, 4	3, Sweet II L	2002
3, GT	3L		2003
70	60	70	2004
50	30, 40	50	2004
7D		7 Digital	2004
5D		5 Digital, Sweet Digital	2005
Maxxum United States	Dynax European Union	α (Alpha) Japan	Release year

=== Digital SLRs ===
- Konica Minolta Maxxum/Dynax 7D
- Konica Minolta Maxxum/Dynax 5D
- Minolta RD-175 (also sold as Agfa ActionCam) (1996) with Minolta A-mount
- Minolta Dimâge RD 3000 with Minolta V-mount

=== APS film and digital cameras - Vectis series ===
- Minolta vectis s 1(SLR-camera)
- Minolta vectis s 100 (SLR-camera)
- Minolta vectis 2000
- Minolta vectis weathermatic
- Minolta Dimâge RD 3000 with Minolta V-mount

=== Digital viewfinder cameras ===
- Minolta Dimâge EX Wide 1500 / Minolta Dimâge EX Zoom 1500 / Minolta MetaFlash 3D 1500
- Minolta DiMAGE 5
- Minolta DiMAGE 7 / Minolta DiMAGE 7UG
- Minolta DiMAGE 7i
- Minolta DiMAGE 7Hi
- Minolta DiMAGE A1
- Konica Minolta DiMAGE A2
- Konica Minolta DiMAGE A200
- (Konica) Minolta DiMAGE Z1
- Konica Minolta DiMAGE Z2
- Konica Minolta DiMAGE Z3
- Konica Minolta DiMAGE Z5
- Konica Minolta DiMAGE Z6
- Konica Minolta DiMAGE Z10
- Konica Minolta DiMAGE Z20
- Minolta DiMAGE X
- Minolta DiMAGE Xi
- Minolta DiMAGE Xt / Xt BIZ
- Konica Minolta DiMAGE Xg
- Konica Minolta DiMAGE X20
- Konica Minolta DiMAGE X21
- Konica Minolta DiMAGE X31
- Konica Minolta DiMAGE X50
- Konica Minolta DiMAGE X60
- Konica Minolta DiMAGE X1
- Minolta DiMAGE S304
- Minolta DiMAGE S404
- Minolta DiMAGE S414
- Minolta Dimâge RD 3000
- Minolta DiMAGE G400
- Minolta DiMAGE G500
- Konica Minolta DiMAGE G530
- Konica Minolta DiMAGE G600
- Minolta DiMAGE F100
- Minolta DiMAGE F200
- Minolta DiMAGE F300
- Minolta DiMAGE E201
- Minolta DiMAGE E203
- Minolta DiMAGE E223
- Minolta DiMAGE E323
- Konica Minolta DiMAGE E40
- Konica Minolta DiMAGE E50
- Konica Minolta DiMAGE E500
- Minolta Dimâge 2300
- Minolta Dimâge 2330
- Minolta Dimâge V
- Minolta Dimâge-Pic

== Exposure meters ==
- Autometer IIIF, IVF, VF
- Flashmeter III, IV, V, VI
- Spotmeter M, F

== Film scanners ==
- Minolta QuickScan 35 (2880) / Minolta QuickScan 35 Plus QS-2800 / QS-35
- Minolta DiMAGE Scan Dual F-2400 (2882)
- Minolta DiMAGE Scan Dual II AF-2820U (2886)
- Minolta DiMAGE Scan Dual III AF-2840 (2889)
- Konica Minolta DiMAGE Scan Dual IV AF-3200 (2891)
- Minolta DiMAGE Scan Speed F-2800 (2884)
- Minolta DiMAGE Scan Multi F-3000 (2883-102)
- Minolta DiMAGE Scan Multi II F-3100 (2883-121)
- Minolta DiMAGE Scan Multi Pro AF-5000 (2887)
- Minolta DiMAGE Scan Elite F-2900 (2885)
- Minolta DiMAGE Scan Elite II AF-2920 (2888)
- Minolta DiMAGE Scan Elite 5400 (2890)
- Konica Minolta DiMAGE Scan Elite 5400 II (2892)

== Flatbed scanners ==
- Konica Minolta SC-110
- Konica Minolta SC-215

== Binoculars ==
- ACTIVA D WP XL 8x42, 10x42 (Roof, BaK-4)
- ACTIVA D WP XL POCKET 8x25, 10x25 (Roof, BaK-4)
- ACTIVA D WP SPORT 8x42, 10x42 (Roof, BaK-4)
- ACTIVA WP 8x25, 10x25, 12x25 (Porro, BaK-4)
- ACTIVA COMPACT FM 8-22x27, 10-30x27 (Porro, BaK-4)
- ACTIVA WP FP 7x35, 7x50, 8x40, 10x50, 12x50 (Porro, BaK-4)
- ACTIVA STANDARD ZOOM 7-15x35, 8-20x50 (Porro, BaK-4)
- ULTRA COMPACT UC I 6x18 (Roof)
- ULTRA COMPACT UC II 6x16 (Roof)
- ULTRA COMPACT UC III 6x16, 8x18 (Roof)
- COMPACT II SUPER 8x25, 10x25L (Porro, BaK-4)
- CLASSIC III WR 7x35, 7x50, 8x40 (Porro, BaK-4)
- CLASSIC WP SPORT for USA/Canada 8x42, 10x50, 12x50 (Porro, BK-7)
- CLASSIC WP SPORT for Europe 8x42, 7x50, 10x50, 12x50 (Porro, BaK-4)
- CLASSIC II 7x35W, 7x50, 8x32, 8x40W, 10x50W
- CLASSIC II ZOOM 7-15x35, 8-20x50 (Porro, BK-7)
- SPORT MINI WP 8x25, 10x25 (Roof, BK-7)
- STANDARD EZ 7x35 9.3", 7x50 7", 10x50 Wide Angle 6.5" (Porro, BK-7)
- STANDARD XL 10x50 Wide Angle 6.5" (Porro, BaK-4)
- STANDARD ZOOM EZ 7-15x35, 8-20x50 (Porro, BK-7)
- STANDARD ZOOM XL 7-15x35, 8-20x50 (Porro, BaK-4)
- STANDARD 7x35EW, 7x50, 8x40EW, 10x50EW (Porro, BaK-4)
- STANDARD ZOOM 7-15x35, 7-21x50 (Porro, BaK-4)
- WEATHERMATIC-YELLOW 7x42, 10x42 (Roof, BaK-4)
- WEATHERMATIC-BLACK 7x42, 10x42 (Roof, BaK-4)
- WEATHERMATIC COMPACT 8x23, 10x23 (Porro, BaK-4)
- POCKET 7x21, 8x22WA, 9x24, 10x25WA (Roof, BK-7)
- POCKET II (Roof, BK-7)
- AUTOFOCUS 8x22, 10x25 (Roof)
- AUTOFOCUS COMPACT 8x22, 10x25

== Photo copiers ==
- Di151
- Di152
- Di181
- Di183
- Di250/350
- Di251/351
- Di2510/3010/3510
- Di450/550
- Di470 * Di520/620
- Di551
- Di650
- Di750
- Di850
- Di1610
- Di1611
- Di2011
- Di5510
- Di7210
- CF1501
- CF2001
- CF2002
- CF3102
- CF5001
- CF9001

- bizhub 164
- bizhub 195
- bizhub 215
- bizhub 25e
- bizhub 227
- bizhub 287
- bizhub 308
- bizhub 368
- bizhub 308e
- Bizhub 181
- Bizhub 200
- Bizhub 223
- Bizhub 224e
- Bizhub 227 (Year Launch 2021)
- Bizhub 25
- Bizhub 25e
- Bizhub 282
- Bizhub 283
- Bizhub 284e
- Bizhub 287
- Bizhub 308
- Bizhub 3301
- Bizhub 3320
- Bizhub 350
- Bizhub 36
- Bizhub 360
- Bizhub 361
- Bizhub 362
- Bizhub 363
- Bizhub 363
- Bizhub 364e
- Bizhub 368
- Bizhub 368e
- Bizhub 4020
- Bizhub 4050
- Bizhub 42
- Bizhub 420
- Bizhub 421
- Bizhub 423
- Bizhub 454e
- Bizhub 458
- Bizhub 458e
- Bizhub 4750
- Bizhub 500
- Bizhub 501
- Bizhub 552
- Bizhub 554e
- Bizhub 558
- Bizhub 558e
- Bizhub 600
- Bizhub 601
- Bizhub 652
- Bizhub 654
- Bizhub 654e
- Bizhub 658
- Bizhub 658e
- Bizhub 700
- Bizhub 751
- Bizhub 754
- Bizhub 754e
- Bizhub 808
- Bizhub 958
- Bizhub C203
- Bizhub C220
- Bizhub C224
- Bizhub C224e
- Bizhub C227
- Bizhub C25
- Bizhub C253
- Bizhub C258
- Bizhub C280
- Bizhub C284
- Bizhub C284e
- Bizhub C287
- Bizhub C308
- Bizhub C3350
- Bizhub C3351
- Bizhub C35
- Bizhub C350
- Bizhub C351
- Bizhub C353
- Bizhub C360
- Bizhub C364
- Bizhub C364e
- Bizhub C368
- Bizhub C3850
- Bizhub C3850FS
- Bizhub C3851
- Bizhub C3851FS
- Bizhub C450
- Bizhub C451
- Bizhub C452
- Bizhub C454
- Bizhub C454e
- Bizhub C458
- Bizhub C550
- Bizhub C552
- Bizhub C552DS
- Bizhub C554
- Bizhub C554e
- Bizhub C558
- Bizhub C558e
- Bizhub C650
- Bizhub C652
- Bizhub C652DS
- Bizhub C654
- Bizhub C654e
- Bizhub C658
- Bizhub C659
- Bizhub C754
- Bizhub C754e
- Bizhub C759
- Planetariums
- MS-6 (for six meter domes)
- MS-8 (for eight meter domes)
- Mediaglobe, Super Mediaglobe, Super Mediaglobe II
- Series II
- Series IIb

== Printers ==
- bizhub 3300P
- bizhub 4000P
- bizhub 4700P
- bizhub C3100P
- magicolor 3730DN
- magicolor 4750EN 4750DN
- magicolor 7450 II
- magicolor 7450 II grafx
- magicolor 8650DN
- pagepro 4650EN

Minolta PT-2

== Chlorophyll meters ==
- SPAD-501
- SPAD-502

== Word processors ==
- PCW1
