= Beaulieu 5008 S =

Professional camera

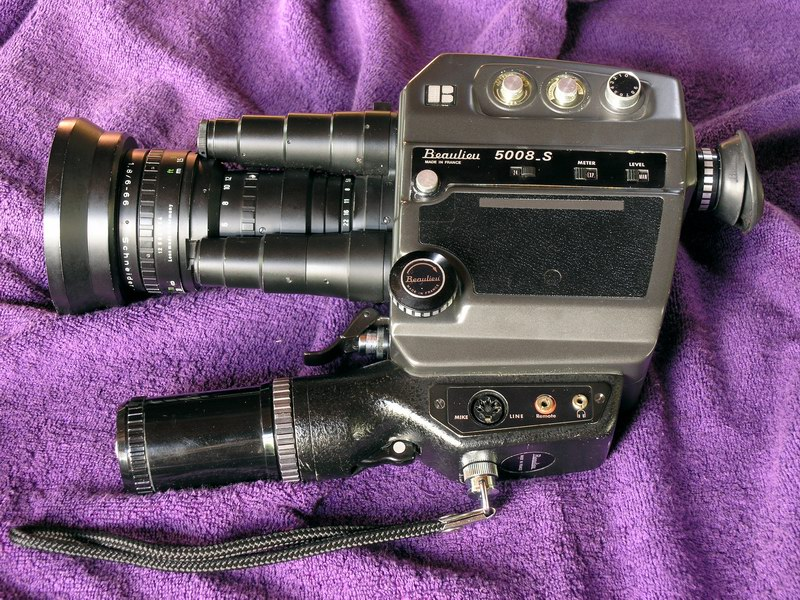
Beaulieu 5008-S with Schneider Kreuznach Optivaron zoom

The Beaulieu 5008 S is a Super 8 mm film dual-speed professional camera. This camera was released by the Beaulieu (company). It was first launched in February 1974. The primary component that set this camera apart from other Super 8mm cameras of the era was that it was made with a unique SLR function and interchangeable Schneider Kreuznach and Angenieux zoom lens.

== Features ==
- Format: Super-8 Kodapak, Kodachrome or Ektachrome (see external link)
- Lens: changeable, Schneider Kreuznach Optivaron zoom 6–66 mm f/1.8 or Angenieux 6–80 mm f/1.2-1.4
- Macro with Schneider Kreuznach: from 0 to 1500 mm (just under 5 ft)
- Filter: built-in Wratten filter 85
- Aperture: motor driven with reflexmatic motor or manual
- Zooming: Electric speed from 4 to 12 seconds or manual
- Viewer: Reflex with tilting matte screen
- Shutter: with guillotine 1/40 sec (18 fps) or 1/60 sec (24 fps)
- Exposure metering: CdS cell
- ASA: 25 to 400
- Remote control: electrical
- Power supply: rechargeable 500mA/ 7.2 V NiCd batt.
- Sound: built-in amplifier 50 to 12 kHz +/- 1.5 dB (24 images) and 50 to 9.5 kHz +/- 1.5 dB (18 images)
- Signal/noise: 57 dB
- Earphone Z > 1.5 KΩ
- Mike: DIN 5 pins, with 3 sensibilities: 0.15mV to 20mV Z = 5KΩ, 3mV to 15mV Z = 100KΩ and 30mV to 1.2V Z = 500KΩ
- Capstan instability: 0.4%
- Dimensions: 34 cm (l) x 10 cm (w) x 21 cm (h)
- Weight: 2.55 kg with Angenieux zoom 6-80

== See also ==
- Super 8 mm film
- Super 8 film cameras
