= Konica Minolta Maxxum 7D =

Konica Minolta Maxxum/Dynax 7D
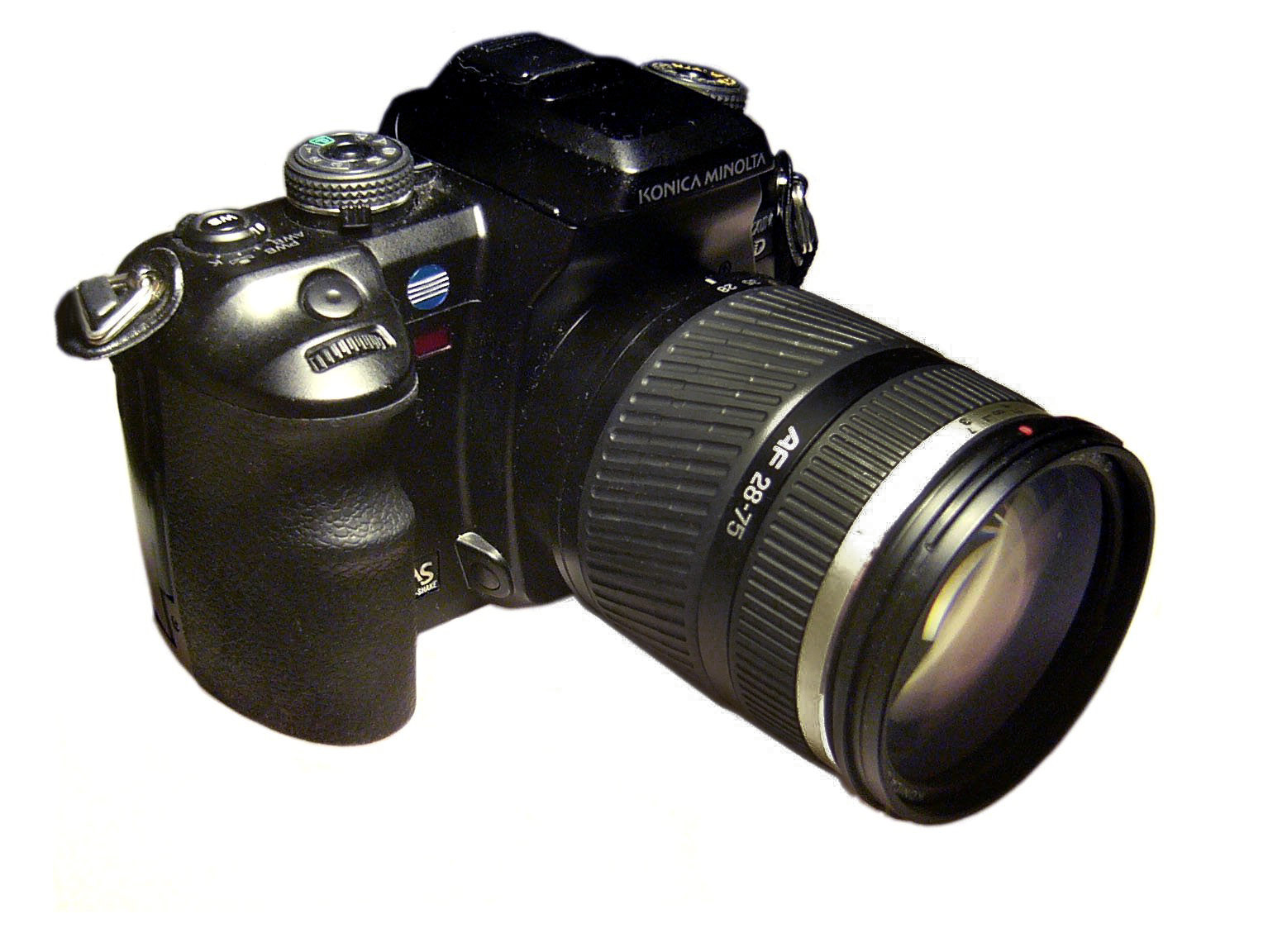
- Konica Minolta Maxxum 7D with lens

Overview
- Maker: Konica Minolta
- Type: DSLR Digital Single-lens reflex
- Released: 2004
- Production: 2004-2006

Lens
- Lens: Interchangeable via Minolta A-type bayonet mount

Sensor/medium
- Sensor: 23.5 × 15.7 mm CCD
- Maximum resolution: 3,008 × 2,000 (6.1 megapixels)
- Film speed: ISO 100, 200, 400, 800, 1600, 3200, and Auto
- Storage media: CompactFlash (CF) (Type I or Type II) or Microdrive

Focusing
- Focus modes: Single-Shot, Continuous, Auto, Manual
- Focus areas: TTL CCD line sensors (9-points, 8 lines with center cross-hair sensor)

Exposure/metering
- Exposure modes: Manual, Shutter-priority, Aperture-priority, Program, Auto, 3-Programmable modes
- Exposure metering: EV 0 to 20 (at ISO 100 with f/1.4 lens)
- Metering modes: 14-segment Honeycomb, Spot, Center Weighted

Flash
- Flash: Built-in pop-up with hotshoe

Shutter
- Shutter: Electronically controlled, vertical-traverse, focal-plane Shutter
- Shutter speed range: 1/4000 sec – 30 sec, or Bulb
- Continuous shooting: RAW / RAW+JPEG: 3 frame/s, up to 9 frames, JPEG Extra Fine: 3 frame/s, up to 12 frames, JPEG Fine: 3 frame/s, up to 15 frames, JPEG Standard: 3 frame/s, up to 19 frames

Viewfinder
- Viewfinder: Eye-level fixed pentaprism

Image processing
- Image processor: CxProcess
- White balance: Auto, 6 adjustable presets, Manual, Color temperature

General
- LCD screen: 2.5" TFT LCD, 207,000 pixels
- Battery: NP-400 Lithium-Ion rechargeable battery
- Optional battery packs: Vertical Control Grip VC-7D
- Weight: 760 g (27 oz) (1.68 lb) body only

The Maxxum 7D, labelled Dynax 7D in Europe/Hong Kong and α-7 Digital in Japan and officially named "DG-7D", is a 6.1 megapixel digital single-lens reflex camera, or DSLR, produced by Konica Minolta. It was the top model of their DSLR range; the Maxxum/Dynax 5D consumer-grade model was the other.

The 7D was first announced on 2004-02-12 at the PMA show, with full details released just before the 2004 photokina show on 2004-09-15. The production camera was released in late 2004. Production ceased when Konica Minolta announced their exit from the camera business in January 2006. Regardless of its high specification (for the time) and innovative feature set, it was priced higher than comparable models at release. The 7D was available as body only, but also with a 17-35mm f/2.8-4 kit lens. Like the Nikon 18-70 kit lens found with many Nikon DSLRs, this lens was regarded as of high enough quality to do justice to the sensor within the body, unlike the cheap zoom kit lenses found with many DSLRs. In 2006 Sony acquired the Konica-Minolta camera business although remaining inventory continued to be sold, alongside the K-M based Sony α100. On release, the camera retailed for around £1000 GBP; somewhere between the Nikon D300 and Canon 40D.

== Physical features ==
The 7D features a magnesium alloy body, plastic backside, and primarily external controls. The body includes external controls for exposure compensation, flash compensation, focus mode, shooting mode, exposure mode, drive mode, metering mode, white balance, focal area, ISO, and two dials that are used to control shutter speed and F-stop. Presence of the external controls for most functions encourage experimentation without having to traverse through menus.

The 7D's 2.5-inch (64 mm) LCD also doubles as the control LCD. Rather than having a second, status LCD located elsewhere like some Canon and Nikon DSLRs, it displays information such as exposure settings, aperture, shutter speed, battery life, and other miscellaneous recording information. The LCD, when acting as the control LCD, also rotates 90° based on the orientation of the camera.

== Anti-shake technology ==
The Konica Minolta Maxxum/Dynax 5D and 7D both come with in-body image stabilization (IBIS): Konica Minolta's Anti-Shake Technology, in which the CCD is on a floating plane controlled by two actuators that work based on detected outside movement and create an inverse movement, thereby keeping the CCD in line with the image.

== Firmware issues ==
The factory firmware that the 7Ds initially shipped with (version 1.00) included a few performance related camera issues which affected initial reviews. The next build of firmware (version 1.10) gave such a great improvement in camera performance that DPReview revised their initial review of the 7D to retract a couple of the main negative points, citing true USB 2.0 speeds up to 25 Mbit/s (up from 7.5 Mbit/s), blinking highlights in the camera's built-in playback mode, the addition of a remote storage function in the transfer modes, and faster times when writing to the CF memory cards.

== Other problems ==
It did have one problem which appeared to afflict all of the 7Ds at one point in their working lives: the development of "first frame black" aka "error 58" in which after a period of not being used, the first frame turned up dark. Sony for a while fixed this problem, and so did some private camera shops, however the parts which caused the problem are no longer available. First Frame Black is often solved by the simple process of turning the camera off and back on, though it can lead to black frames all the time.

Another significant problem is misalignment of the sensor, where the sensor is stuck at one of the positions it can take up to counteract camera shake; or it fails completely, often due to one of the piezo actuators which 'shake' the sensor. There is a chugging sound and no picture can be taken. Repairs for this are prohibitive but are still available at a few specialist centers.

== Konica Minolta and Sony ==
In July 2005, Konica Minolta announced a partnership with Sony to research and develop camera technologies. The following March, Konica Minolta announced its withdrawal from the camera business altogether and transferred all of its camera assets to Sony as of March 2006.

Sony's line of Alpha DSLR cameras built upon the digital Maxxum line, keeping many of the features that made the Maxxum 7D and 5D popular, most notably the built-in Anti-Shake technology. All Sony DSLR cameras came to support the Minolta α mount lens system which makes newer Sony-built lenses compatible with Maxxum bodies and Maxxum lenses compatible with newer Sony bodies.

== See also ==
- List of Minolta products
- Minolta A-mount system

| Level | Sensor | 2004 | 2005 | 2006 | 2007 | 2008 | 2009 | 2010 | 2011 | | 2012 | 2013 | 2014 | 2015 | 2016 | 2017 | 2018 | 2019 | 2020 |
| Professional | Full frame | | | | | | α900 | | | | | α99 | | | | α99 II | | | |
| Professional | Full frame | | | | | | | α850 | | | | | | | | | | | |
| High-end | APS-C | | DG-7D | | | α700 | | | | α77 | | | | α77 II | | | | | |
| Midrange | APS-C | | | | | | | | | α65 | | | | | α68 | | | | |
| Upper-entry | APS-C | | | | | | | | α55 | | α57 | | | | | | | | |
| Upper-entry | APS-C | | | | α100 | | | α550 ^{F} | α580 | | | | α58 | | | | | | |
| Upper-entry | APS-C | | DG-5D | | | | | α500 | α560 | | | | | | | | | | |
| Upper-entry | APS-C | | | | | | | α450 | | | | | | | | | | | |
| Entry-level | APS-C | | | | | | | | α33 | α35 | α37 | | | | | | | | |
| Entry-level | APS-C | | | | | α350 ^{F} | | α380 | α390 | | | | | | | | | | |
| Entry-level | APS-C | | | | | α300 | | α330 | | | | | | | | | | | |
| Entry-level | APS-C | | | | | α200 | | α230 | α290 | | | | | | | | | | |
| Early models | Minolta 7000 with SB-70/SB-70S (1986) · Minolta 9000 with SB-90/SB-90S (1986) (Still video SLRs); Minolta MS-C1100 (1992) · Minolta RD-175 (1995) | | | | | | | | | | | | | | | | | | |
| Level | Sensor | | | | | | | | | | | | | | | | | | |
| Level | Sensor | 2004 | 2005 | 2006 | 2007 | 2008 | 2009 | 2010 | 2011 | | 2012 | 2013 | 2014 | 2015 | 2016 | 2017 | 2018 | 2019 | 2020 |
