= Sony Alpha 100 =

Sony α100
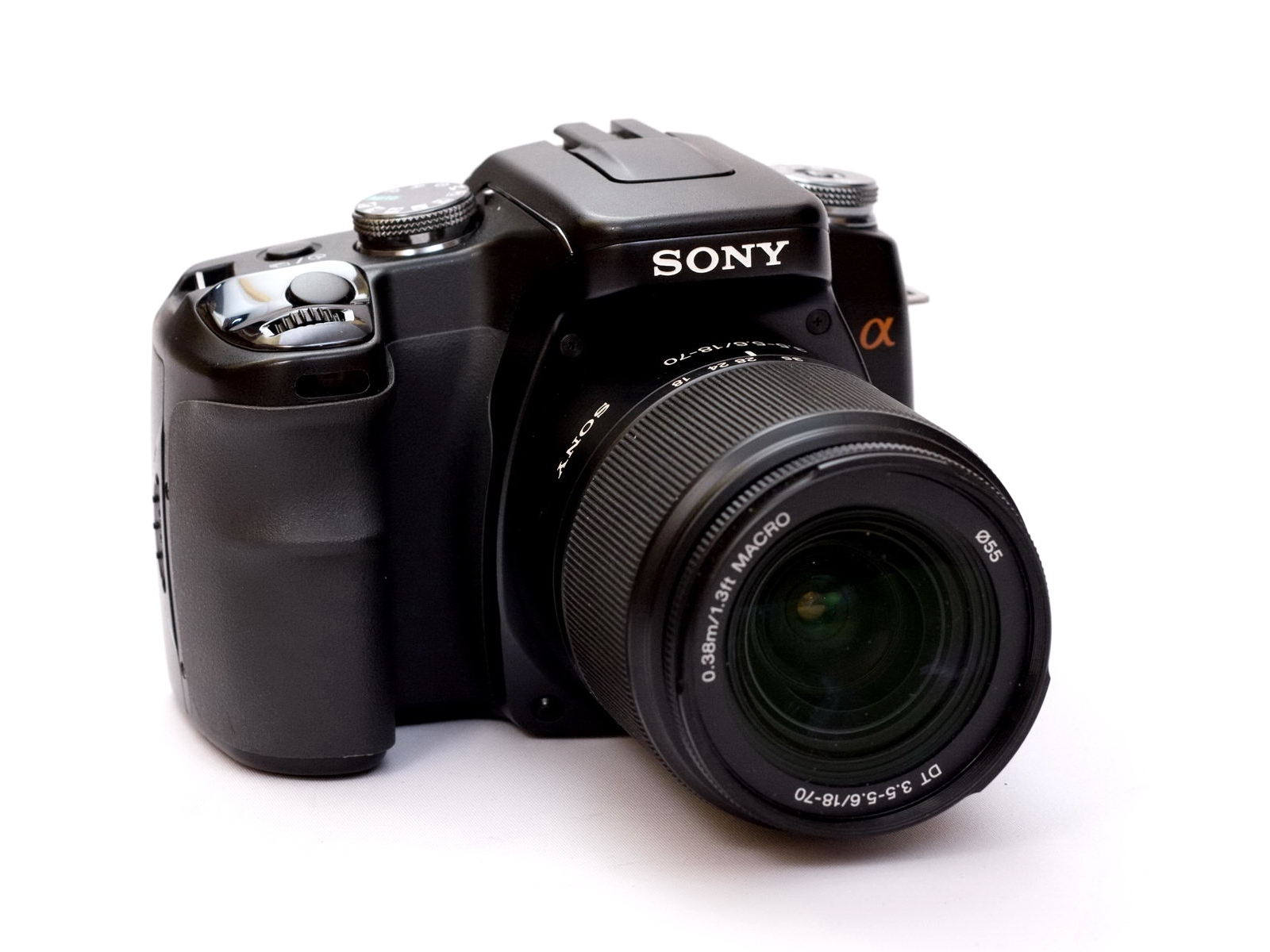

Overview
- Maker: Sony
- Type: Digital single-lens reflex camera

Lens
- Lens: interchangeable, Sony A-mount / Konica Minolta A-mount

Sensor/medium
- Sensor: 23.6 mm × 15.8 mm 10.2 effective megapixels CCD
- Maximum resolution: 3872 × 2592 pixels (10.2 Megapixels)
- Film speed: Auto, 100, 200, 400, 800, 1600, Lo 80, Hi 200
- Storage media: CompactFlash I/II, Memory Stick PRO (with adapter), Memory Stick PRO Duo (with included adapter)

Focusing
- Focus modes: manual focus point selection, Spot AF, Continuous AF and AF Lock
- Focus areas: 9-points, 8 lines with center cross-hair sensor, TTL CCD line sensors

Exposure/metering
- Exposure modes: full manual, Program Auto, Aperture Priority, Shutter Priority, ±2.0 EV, 1/3 EV Steps Exposure Compensation, 3 frames brcketting
- Exposure metering: 40-segment honeycomb sensing system provides multi-pattern measuring
- Metering modes: Multi-segment, Center-weighted, Spot

Flash
- Flash: Manual Pop-up: Auto, Fill-flash, Rear flash sync, Wireless off camera flash (with Flash HVL-F56AM, F36AM), GN12 at ISO 100 (39 feet (12 meters)

Shutter
- Shutter: electronically controlled, vertical-traverse, focal-plane Shutter
- Shutter speed range: 30–1/4000 sec, with Bulb, 1/160 sec X-sync
- Continuous shooting: 3 Frames Per Second, unlimited JPEG, up to 6 raw

Viewfinder
- Viewfinder: optical, spherical Acute Matte screen, 20mm eye relief, 0.83x magnification, dioptre adjustment, 95% frame coverage, pentamirror

Image processing
- White balance: Auto, daylight, shade, cloudy, tungsten, fluorescent, flash, color temperature, custom
- WB bracketing: 3 frames

General
- LCD screen: 230k pixel, 2.5-inch TFT LCD
- Battery: 7.2 V, 1600 mAh
- Weight: 545 g (19.2 oz)

Sony α100 (DSLR-A100) is the first digital single-lens reflex camera (DSLR) marketed by Sony in 2006. It is the successor to the previous Konica Minolta DSLR models (primarily the Maxxum/Dynax 5D and 7D) through Sony's purchase of the Konica Minolta camera division. The α100 retains a similar body design and claimed improvements on Konica Minolta's Anti-Shake sensor-shifting image stabilization feature, renamed Super SteadyShot. It uses a 10.2 megapixel APS-C sized CCD sensor. Another notable feature inherited from Konica Minolta is Eyestart, which provides for automatic autofocus activation by detecting the presence of the photographer's eye on the viewfinder, thus quickening the camera's response.

Another notable feature is an automatically vibrating CCD to remove dust each time the camera is shut off. The α100 shipped from Sony and resellers by the end of July 2006 with MSRP prices of US$1000 with the 18–70 mm f/3.5–f/5.6 kit lens and US$900 for the body only. The camera retains the same autofocus lens mount that was introduced with the Minolta Maxxum 7000 in 1985, allowing the continued use of the millions of existing Minolta AF lenses.

Level	Sensor	2004	2005	2006	2007	2008	2009	2010	2011		2012	2013	2014	2015	2016	2017	2018	2019	2020
Professional	Full frame						α900					α99				α99 II			
Professional	Full frame							α850											
High-end	APS-C		DG-7D			α700				α77				α77 II					
Midrange	APS-C									α65					α68				
Upper-entry	APS-C								α55		α57								
Upper-entry	APS-C				α100			α550 ^{F}	α580				α58						
Upper-entry	APS-C		DG-5D					α500	α560										
Upper-entry	APS-C							α450											
Entry-level	APS-C								α33	α35	α37								
Entry-level	APS-C					α350 ^{F}		α380	α390										
Entry-level	APS-C					α300		α330											
Entry-level	APS-C					α200		α230	α290										
Early models	Minolta 7000 with SB-70/SB-70S (1986) · Minolta 9000 with SB-90/SB-90S (1986) (Still video SLRs); Minolta MS-C1100 (1992) · Minolta RD-175 (1995)																		
Level	Sensor																		
Level	Sensor	2004	2005	2006	2007	2008	2009	2010	2011		2012	2013	2014	2015	2016	2017	2018	2019	2020
