= Super 8 camera =

Early camcorder used in cinematography

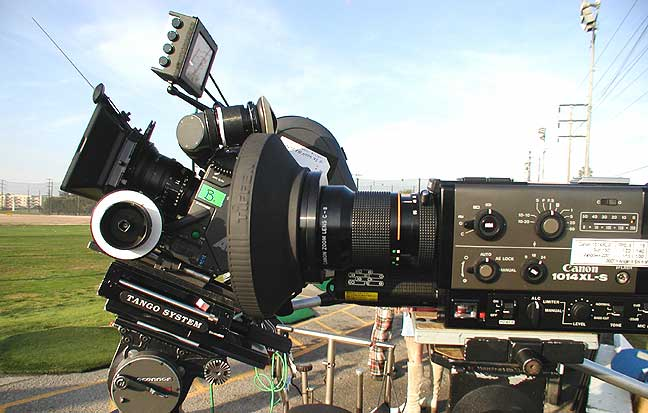
Canon brand Super 8mm camera, used for television commercials.

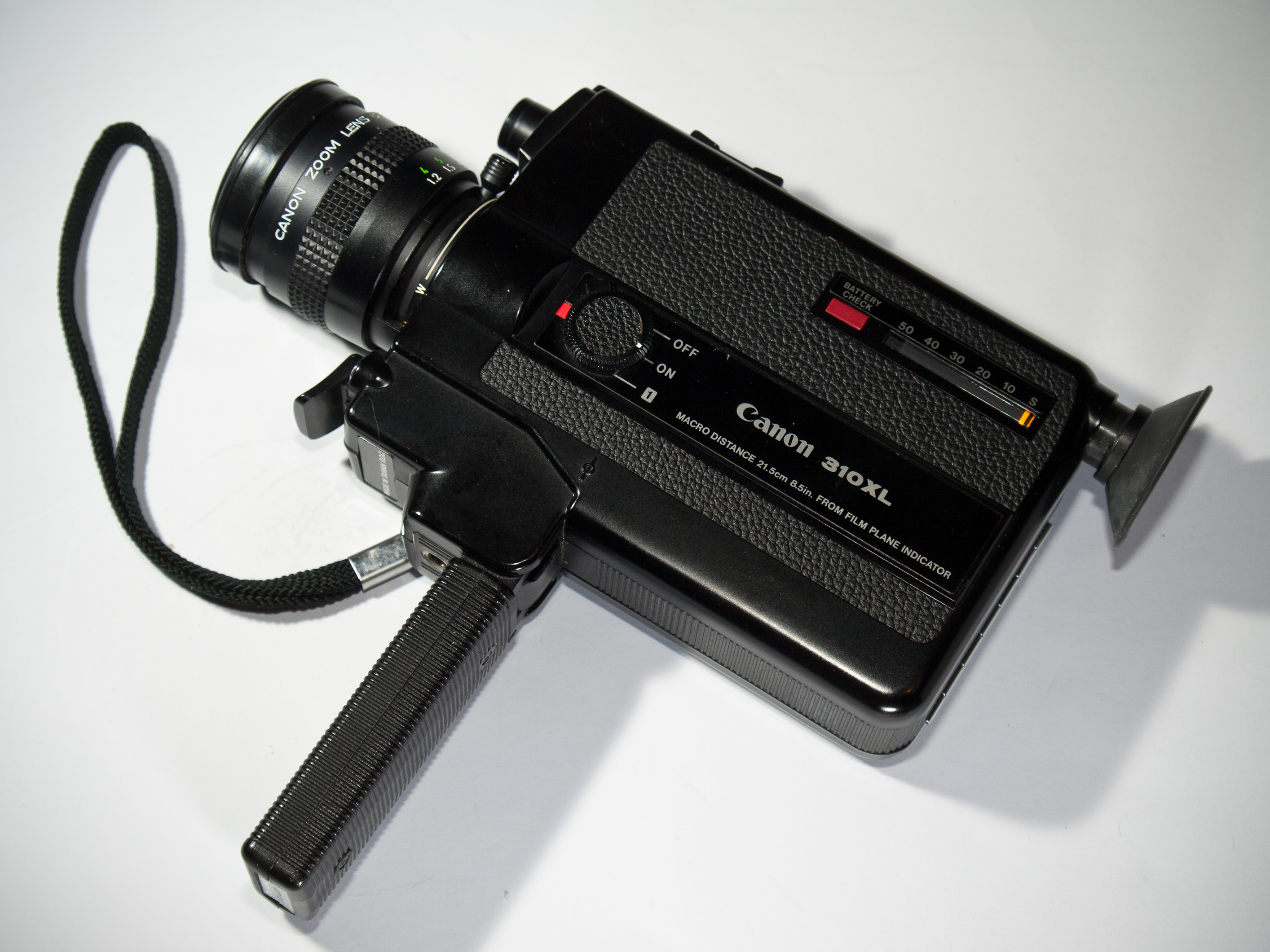
Canon 310XL Super 8 from 1976

A Super 8mm camera is a motion picture camera specifically manufactured to use the Super 8mm motion picture format. Super 8mm film cameras were first manufactured in 1965 by Kodak for their newly introduced amateur film format, which replaced the Standard 8 mm film format. Manufacturing continued until the rise in popularity of video cameras in the mid-1970s. In 2014 the first new Super 8mm camera in 30 years was introduced by the Danish company Logmar Camera Solutions. Most other cameras readily available are from the 1960s through the 1980s.

== Super 8mm cameras ==
The first camera to be formatted for the new film was the Kodak M2. During the late 1960s, cameras were only formatted to film at 18 frames per second, but as technology improved, speeds such as 24 frame/s (the motion-picture standard) and faster speeds (for slow-motion filming) were incorporated into camera mechanics.

== Super 8mm film stock ==
Super 8mm film cameras do not need to use the Super 8mm film produced by Kodak, but other film stocks produced by companies such as Fujifilm and independents (in the form of re-packaged film) are compatible. The only difference to the films is the cartridge used to insert them into the camera. All lengths of film sold are of 50 ft (15 m) lengths. Kodak did produce 200 ft (61 m) and sound cartridges, but these have since been discontinued. Most stocks are reversal film (for simple projection) but some negative stocks have been produced.

In 1965, the original emulsion released was Kodachrome II colour film. However, in 2005, Kodak announced it would stop manufacturing Kodachrome stock. The discontinuation was due to the steps K-14 development used. Nowadays, Kodak Super 8mm film cartridges are sold as either Ektachrome colour reversal film, Tri-X black and white reversal film or Vision 3 colour negative film (in 200 ISO and 500 ISO speeds). Fuji Velvia 50 and a number of other stocks are also available.

== Super 8mm brands ==
Many companies manufactured cameras and equipment for use with the format. Many well-known brands such as Kodak, Canon and Agfa made cameras, projectors and stock for use with the cameras.

List of camera manufacturers

Note: Many companies (such as Kmart's Focal range) used re-branded products; these have not been included into the list.

- 3M
- Agfa
- Bauer
- Beaulieu
- Bell and Howell
- Bolex
- Braun (Nizo)
- Canon
- Chinon
- Copal
- Cosina
- Elmo
- Eumig
- Fujifilm (Fuji)
- GAF
- Halina (Haking)
- Kodak
- Konica
- Logmar Camera Solutions
- LOMO
- Minolta
- Nikon
- Pathé
- Raynox
- Ricoh
- Rollei
- Sankyo
- Yashica
