= Minolta 5000i =

35mm single-lens reflex camera

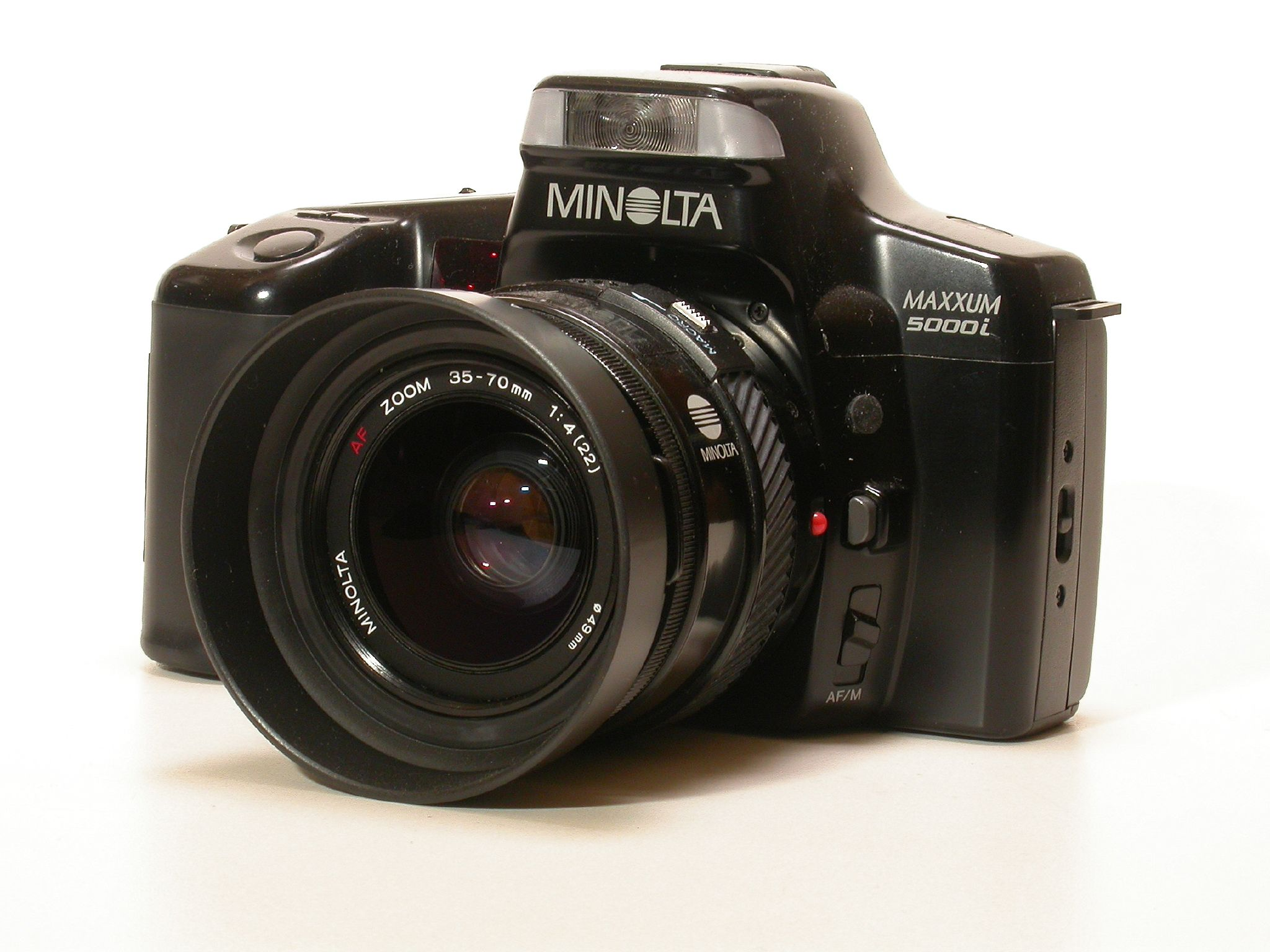

Overview
- Type: 35mm SLR

Lens
- Lens mount: Minolta A-mount

Focusing
- Focus: TTL phase detecting autofocus

Exposure/metering
- Exposure: Program, Aperture priority, Shutter priority and depth-of-field autoexposure; match-needle manual 6 zone evaluative or 6.5% partial metering

Flash
- Flash: Internal

General
- Battery: 2CR5 6 V
- Dimensions: 148×97×65 mm (5.8×3.8×2.6 in)

The Minolta 5000i (also known as the Maxxum 5000i in North America, the Dynax 5000i in Europe, and the α-5700i in Japan) is a 35mm single-lens reflex camera belonging to the second generation of bodies in Minolta's autofocus SLR system, fitting between the cheaper 3000i and the more expensive, semi-pro 7000i, and replacing the 5000. The "i" in the names of the new camera range stood for "intelligence". Like the 7000i, the 5000i supported Minolta's Creative Expansion Cards, plug-in electronic modules that added new functionality to the camera.

The 5000i uses Minolta's second generation wide-area autofocus sensor, giving single-shot autofocus including predictive autofocus on a moving subject; continuous AF is available with the optional Sports Action expansion card. The camera's available exposure modes out of the box were Program (using a 2-area evaluative metering system) and Manual (with a center-weighted averaging meter). Aperture priority and shutter priority are available with the optional A/S Mode expansion card.

Unlike the 7000i, the 5000i includes a built-in flash, rigidly mounted on the pentaprism; Minolta claimed that this was "the world's most compact AF SLR camera with built-in flash". The flash fires automatically in Program mode if the camera determines that the shutter speed will be too low to hand-hold, or that the main subject is backlit. The flash can be turned off if not desired and can be manually selected in Manual mode. The X-sync shutter speed is 1/90 second. A proprietary Minolta flash shoe atop the pentaprism allows the use of dedicated Minolta flashes.

Class	1985	1986	1987	1988	1989	1990	1991	1992	1993	1994	1995	1996	1997	1998	1999	2000	2001	2002	2003	2004	2005	2006
Higher flagship	9000 AF							9xi						9/9Ti								
Higher flagship																7						
Higher flagship																	7 Limited					
Lower flagship													800si									
Enthusiast	7000 AF				7000i																	
Enthusiast							8000i															
Enthusiast							7xi															
Enthusiast									700si													
Higher entry-Level		5000			5000i																	
Higher entry-Level								5xi														
Higher entry-Level										400si												
Higher entry-Level											500si			505si			5					
Higher entry-Level											600si classic			505si super								
Higher entry-Level																				70/60		
Lower entry-Level
Lower entry-Level					3000i																	
Lower entry-Level							3xi															
Lower entry-Level						2xi																
Lower entry-Level											300si				404si			4				
Lower entry-Level																			3			
Lower entry-Level																				50/40		
