= Minolta Maxxum 4 =

35mm SLR camera

The Minolta Maxxum 4 (Dynax 4 in Europe and Dynax 3 in "Asia Pacific countries") 35mm SLR camera was introduced in 2002. Konica Minolta has discontinued production of this model but maintains information on it in its website.

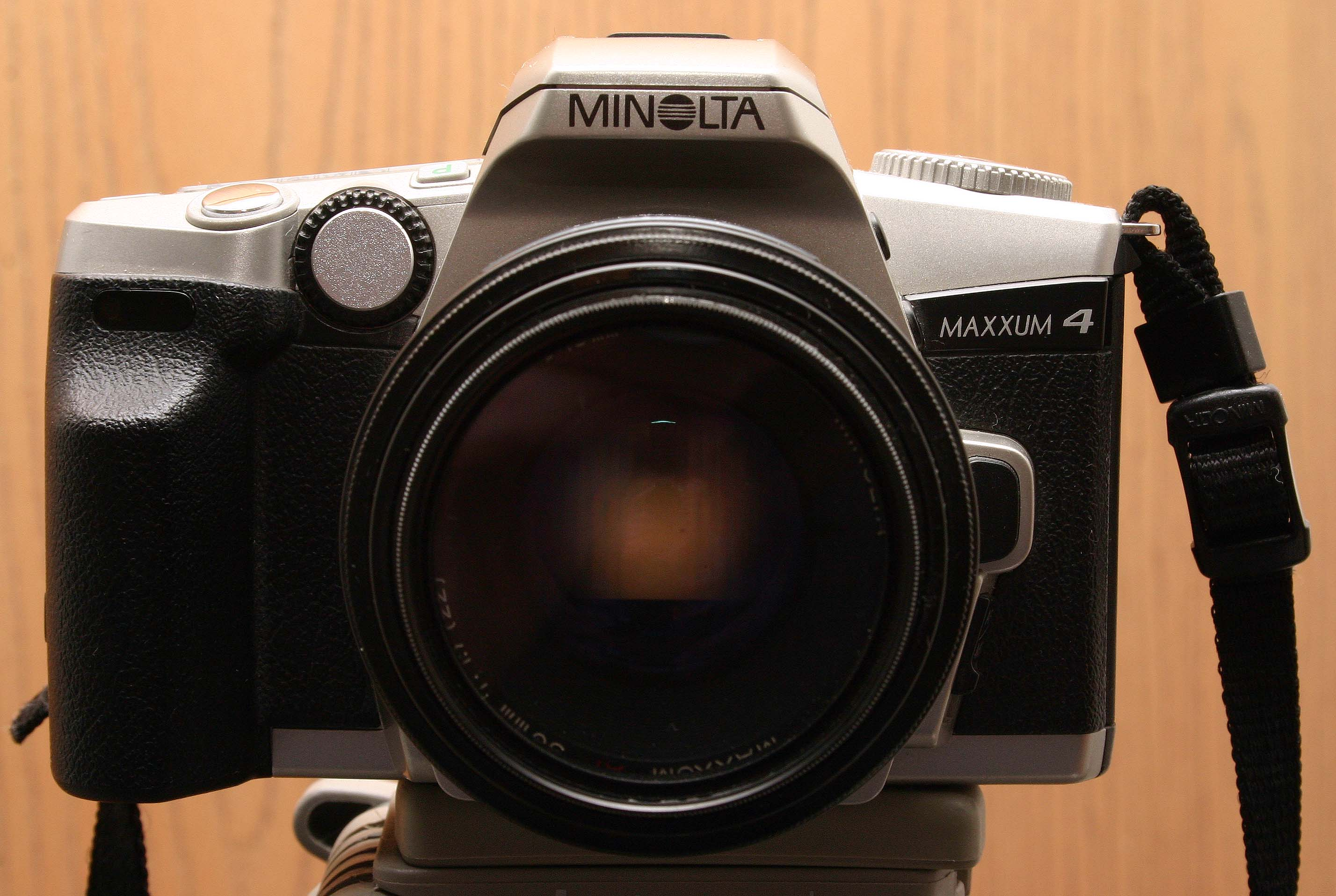
A Minolta Maxxum 4 on a tripod.

Capable of automatic focus, the Maxxum 4 has through-the-lens metering, a built-in pop-up flash and a hot shoe for flash. The shutter is an "electronically-controlled, vertical-traverse, focal-plane type." It uses infrared sensors to focus, so for this reason the camera's manual advises against using it for infrared photography.

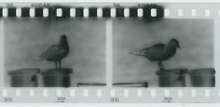
Infrared negatives fogged by the frame counter of a Minolta Maxxum 4.

In addition to the essential modes P, A, S and M, the Maxxum 4 has all the usual quick-modes for the beginner: portrait, landscape, close-up, sports and night portrait. As with comparable film cameras of the period, the Maxxum 4 has multiple-frame drive mode, and self-timer; the maximum speed for continuous shooting is just short of two frames per second. Also, like other similar cameras, the Maxxum 4 has a built-in pop-up flash as well as a shoe for a dedicated flash with TTL flash control.

The camera has three autofocus sensors. The centre one is a cross-type sensor. To achieve focus outside the "Wide Focus Area" covered by these three sensors, the manual instructs the user to center the desired subject for focus, engage focus lock, then recompose the shot. This is standard procedure for autofocus systems of this type.

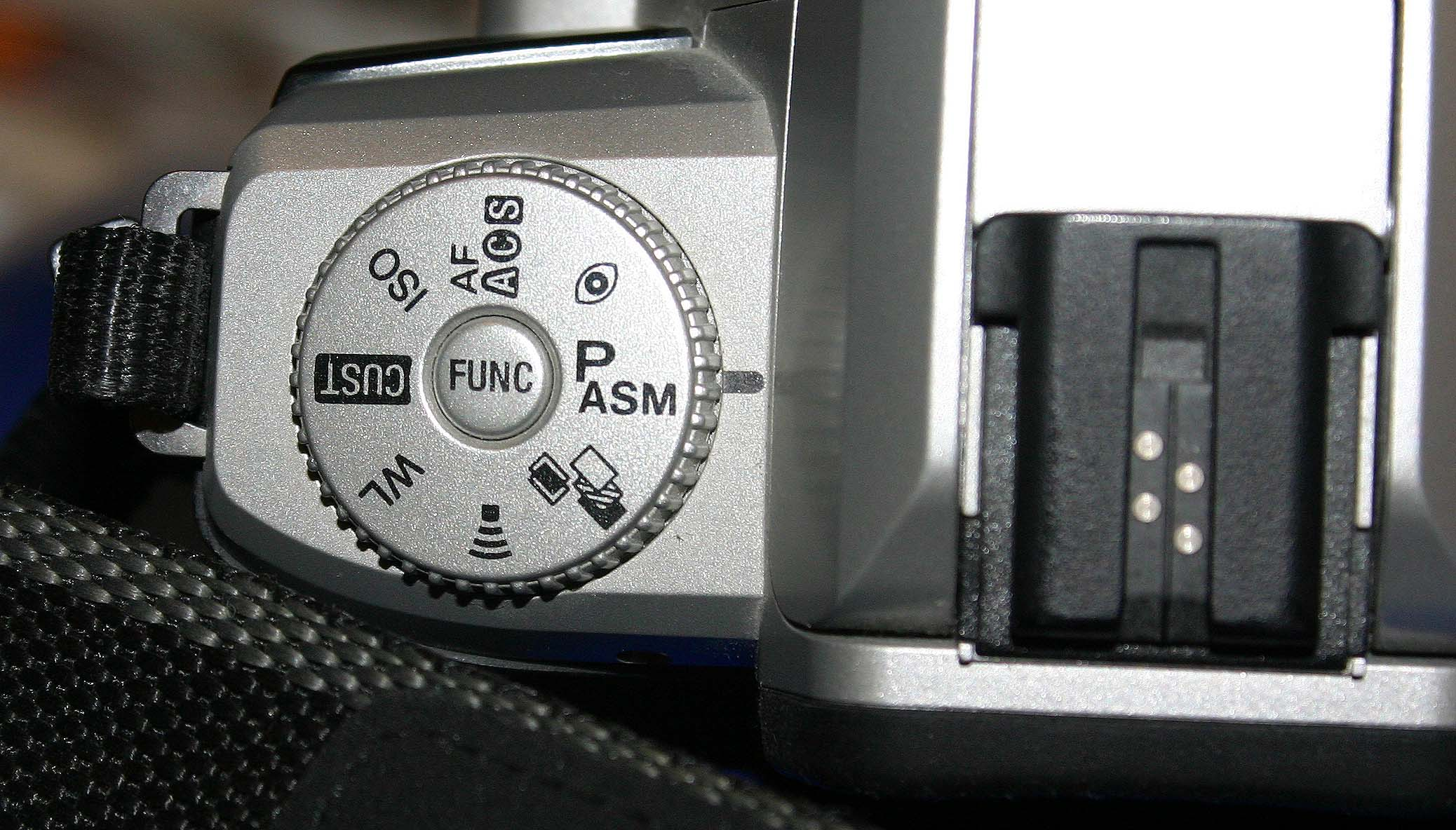
The function dial of a Minolta Maxxum 4. Note also the shape of the flash shoe.

Any standard 35mm still-film (135 format) may be used with a few caveats: Polaroid 35mm instant film should not be used because "winding problems may occur"; infrared film is not recommended because the frame counter shines infrared light at the sprockets (this is a very common feature with motorised film-advance cameras); the camera can not advance beyond the 40th frame in rolls of film with more than 40 frames.

Class	1985	1986	1987	1988	1989	1990	1991	1992	1993	1994	1995	1996	1997	1998	1999	2000	2001	2002	2003	2004	2005	2006
Higher flagship	9000 AF							9xi						9/9Ti								
Higher flagship																7						
Higher flagship																	7 Limited					
Lower flagship													800si									
Enthusiast	7000 AF				7000i																	
Enthusiast							8000i															
Enthusiast							7xi															
Enthusiast									700si													
Higher entry-Level		5000			5000i																	
Higher entry-Level								5xi														
Higher entry-Level										400si												
Higher entry-Level											500si			505si			5					
Higher entry-Level											600si classic			505si super								
Higher entry-Level																				70/60		
Lower entry-Level
Lower entry-Level					3000i																	
Lower entry-Level							3xi															
Lower entry-Level						2xi																
Lower entry-Level											300si				404si			4				
Lower entry-Level																			3			
Lower entry-Level																				50/40		
