= Chinon CE-5 =

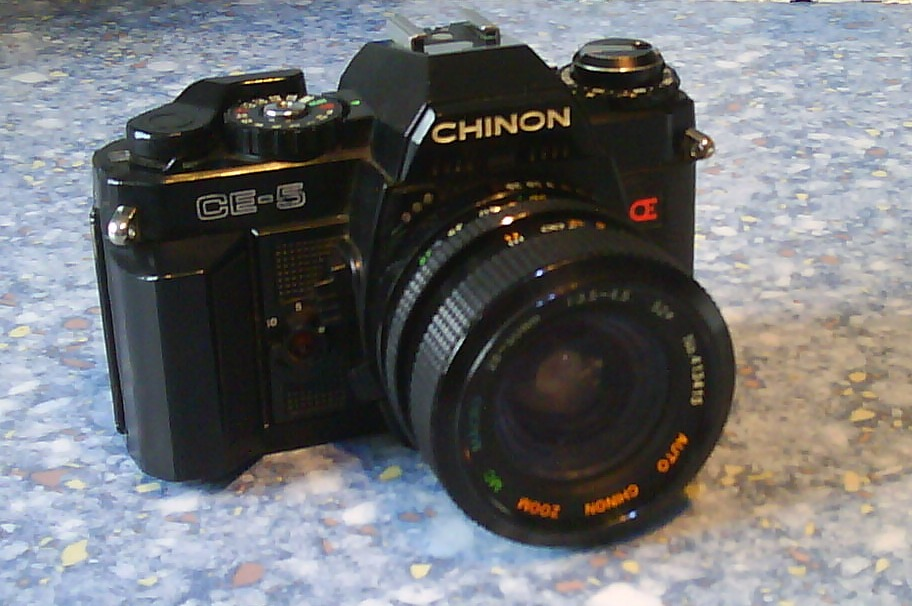
A Chinon CE-5 with a lens fitted.

The Chinon CE-5 was a 35mm SLR camera produced by Chinon, that was one of the first cameras to have autofocus-capable lenses produced for it.

== Specifications ==
The camera had a Pentax K mount (addressed to in the specifications as the Chinon "universal mount") with which its lenses were mounted. 3 autofocus pins were present upon the top-left of the mount, which the autofocus lenses interfaced with. These autofocus lenses were rather heavy and depended upon their own large, lens-mounted motors.

The camera had two modes: aperture-priority and full manual. The shutter speeds ranged from 4 to 1/2000 seconds (stepless) in aperture priority mode and 2 to 1/2000 seconds in manual mode, in addition to a "bulb" mode. The shutter was controlled electronically in both modes; and was a Seiko electromagnetic metal focal plane shutter. A multiple exposure switch was also incorporated into the camera, alongside a 5 or 10 second self-timer.

The CE-5 was shipped with a full ground glass screen along with a split image range finder and a microprism collar to aid focusing. Other screens were made available.

An "X sync" flash hotshoe was incorporated, with contacts especially for the Chinon range of dedicated flashes.

The camera had the dimensions 135.5mm width x 88mm height x 50.5mm depth and weighed approximately 490 grams without batteries and lens.

== Accessories ==
Many accessories were made available for the CE-5 soon after its production, including power winders, dedicated flashes, "Info-Back" data-imprinting units, "Auto Date digital data imprinting" units, lenses advertised as "Super multicoated lenses", autofocus lenses and more.
