= Minolta 7000i =

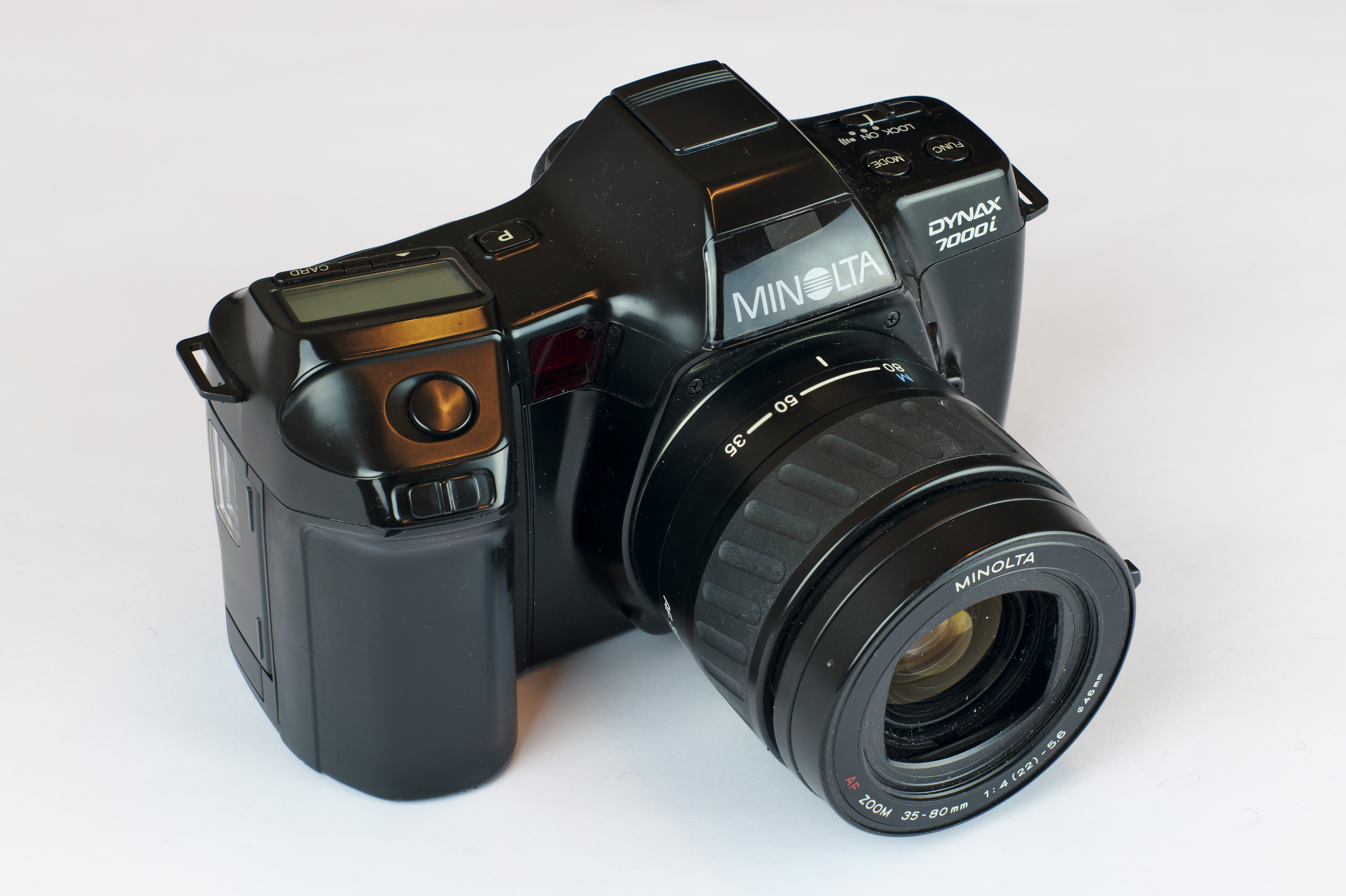

Overview
- Type: 35mm SLR

Lens
- Lens mount: Minolta A-mount

Focusing
- Focus: TTL phase detecting autofocus

Exposure/metering
- Exposure: Program, Aperture priority, Shutter priority and depth-of-field autoexposure; match-needle manual 6 zone evaluative or 6.5% partial metering

Flash
- Flash: Hot-shoe only

The Minolta Dynax 7000i is a 24x36mm auto-focus SLR camera, introduced by Minolta in 1988. It was sold in North America as Maxxum 7000i and in Japan as α-7700i.

This camera had the usual Program AE, Shutter priority AE, Aperture priority AE and metered manual exposure modes (standard on the 7000), TTL autoflash (like the Minolta 7000) and added a newer faster and more sensitive AF system, faster shutter speed (1/4000s), faster film advance (3 frame/s), new flash hot-shoe that was incompatible with the older flash system. The 7000i supported the Minolta AF lens system, and other accessories such as the remote cords.

Perhaps more innovative than any other improvement was the expansion card system. While also used in other models in the i-series, some models in the xi-series, and some si-series cameras, the Minolta Creative Expansion Card System debuted on this model. The expansion card system provided a way to add features to the camera, such as multi-spot metering, or re-program the built-in AE modes to favor faster shutter speeds or smaller apertures, such as the sports action card.

Class	1985	1986	1987	1988	1989	1990	1991	1992	1993	1994	1995	1996	1997	1998	1999	2000	2001	2002	2003	2004	2005	2006
Higher flagship	9000 AF							9xi						9/9Ti								
Higher flagship																7						
Higher flagship																	7 Limited					
Lower flagship													800si									
Enthusiast	7000 AF				7000i																	
Enthusiast							8000i															
Enthusiast							7xi															
Enthusiast									700si													
Higher entry-Level		5000			5000i																	
Higher entry-Level								5xi														
Higher entry-Level										400si												
Higher entry-Level											500si			505si			5					
Higher entry-Level											600si classic			505si super								
Higher entry-Level																				70/60		
Lower entry-Level
Lower entry-Level					3000i																	
Lower entry-Level							3xi															
Lower entry-Level						2xi																
Lower entry-Level											300si				404si			4				
Lower entry-Level																			3			
Lower entry-Level																				50/40		
