= Minolta 16 =

Series of 16mm film cameras

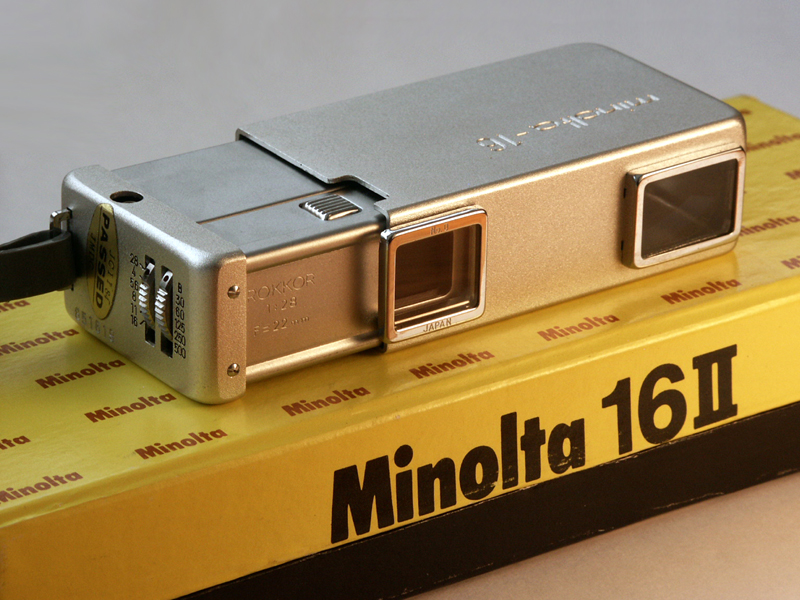
Minolta 16 II, 1960

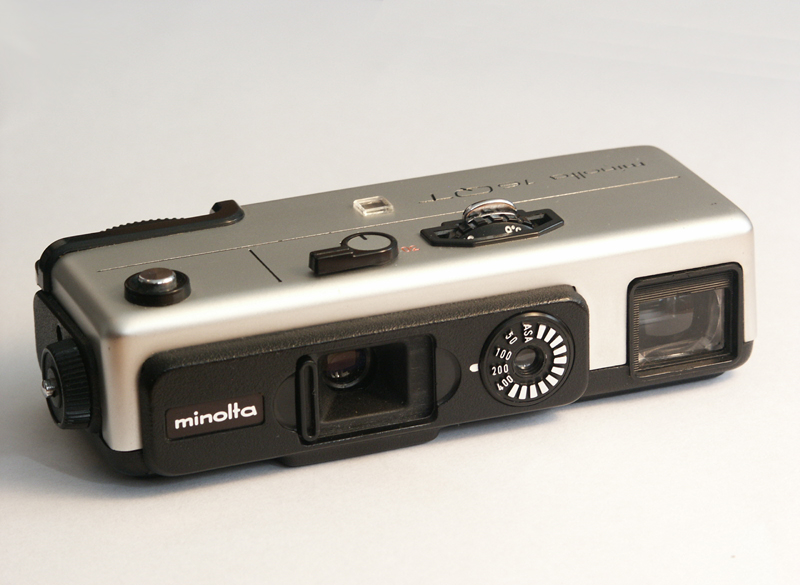
Minolta 16 QT, 1972

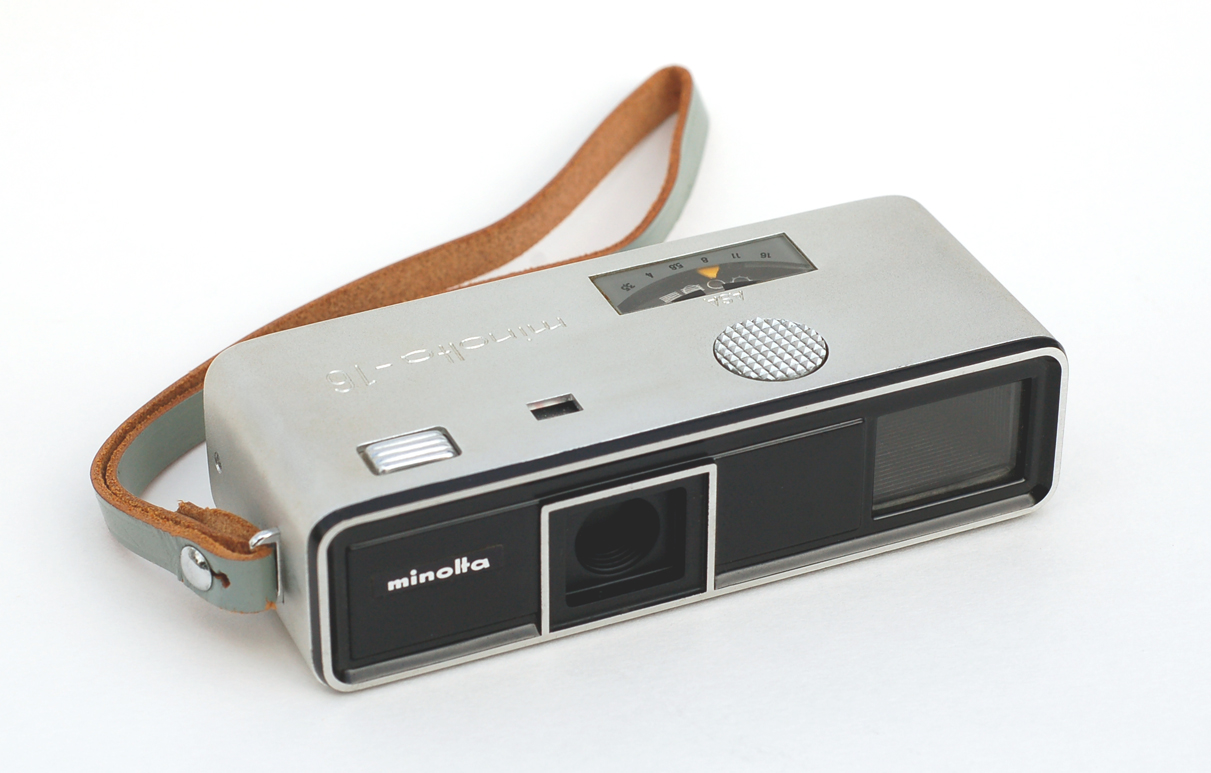
Minolta 16 P, 1960

Minolta 16 refers to a line of 16mm subminiature cameras made by Minolta between 1955 and 1974. The negative size was 10x14 mm for the earlier models, later, a larger format, 12x17 mm was adopted, using single-perforated 16 mm film. It was possible for the user to load cassettes, and also develop the film using a special developing tank with a spiral insert for 16 mm film.

== History ==
The Minolta 16 can be traced back to the Mica Automat built by Konan in 1947. Minolta bought out Konan in the early 1950s and continued producing cameras under the Konan name for several years. The first camera labeled Minolta 16 rather than Konan 16 was the Minolta 16 Automat of 1955. The Minolta 16 used a newly designed film cassette which was not compatible with the Konan models.

== Models ==
The first Minolta 16 camera was the 16 Automat (1955), which was almost identical to the Konan 16 Automat. It featured a fixed-focus 25mm lens, apertures from f/3.5 to f/11, and shutter speeds from 1/50 to 1/200 plus bulb. Film advance was via a Minox-style push-pull housing.

The 16 was the second Minolta 16 model, introduced in 1957. Basically a more streamlined Automat, it was modified to allow for slip-on filters and close-up lenses and had fewer shutter speeds. It was available in six colors in addition to the standard chrome. This was followed three years later by the 16 II, which appeared identical to the 16 but featured an improved lens and expanded shutter speeds (1/30 to 1/500 plus B) and aperture ranges (2.8 to 16). There was also a version of the 16 II with a built-in transistor radio, which was sold as the Sonocon 16 MB-ZA starting in 1962.

The 16 P, came out in 1960. It had a rigid body, and aperture range of f3.5-f16.

The 16 EE, introduced in 1962, featured a built-in selenium light meter and shutter-priority automatic exposure. In terms of other features (lens, aperture range, etc.) it was basically similar to the 16 II, though it was larger, had a rigid plastic body, and offered no manual settings. It was replaced in 1963 by the 16 EE2, which used a CdS cell instead of a selenium meter.

As its 16mm cameras had been growing increasingly large through the addition of more features, Minolta introduced a new and much smaller model, the 16 MG, in 1966. It lacked automatic exposure, but included a light meter and match-needle that were almost as easy to use and offered the added bonus of manual exposure control. The aperture and shutter speed were set at the same time using a single "exposure" dial. The meter was a selenium unit, which did not require a battery and hence allowed the camera to be made smaller. The 16 MGS of 1970 was similar but used single-perforated film, which allowed the negative size to be increased and picture quality improved.

The last Minolta 16 was the 16 QT, which was produced from 1972 to 1974. It was a simplified version of the MGS, designed to compete with the new 110 format. The QT had a 23mm lens, apertures from f/3.5 to f/22 and two shutter speeds, 1/30 and 1/250. It also offered manual focusing, a departure from previous models.
