= Chinon Industries =

Japanese camera manufacturer

Chinon Industries Inc. チノン株式会社
- Company type: Kabushiki gaisha
- Industry: electronics
- Founded: 1948
- Defunct: 2004
- Headquarters: Nagano, Japan
- Key people: Joel Proegler, last president of Chinon
- Products: Cameras, computer peripherals
- Website: www.chinon.co.jp

Chinon Industries Inc. (チノン株式会社, Chinon Kabushiki-gaisha) was a Japanese camera manufacturer. Kodak took a majority stake in the company in 1997, and made it a fully owned subsidiary of Kodak Japan, Kodak Digital Product Center, Japan Ltd. (株式会社コダック デジタル プロダクト センター, Kabushiki-gaisha Kodakku Dejitaru Purodakuto Sentā), in 2004. As a subsidiary, it continues to develop digital camera models.

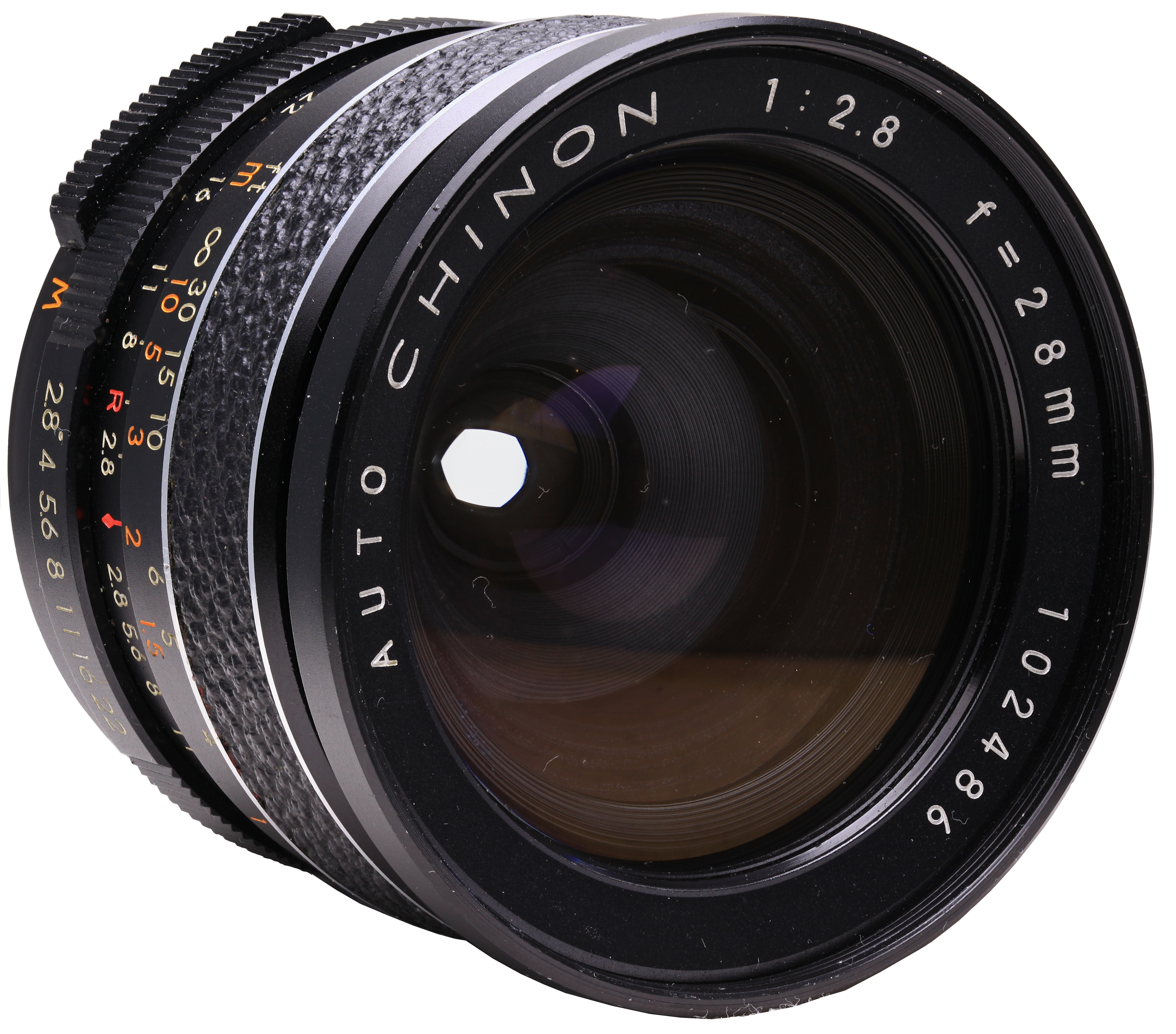
AUTO CHINON 28MM

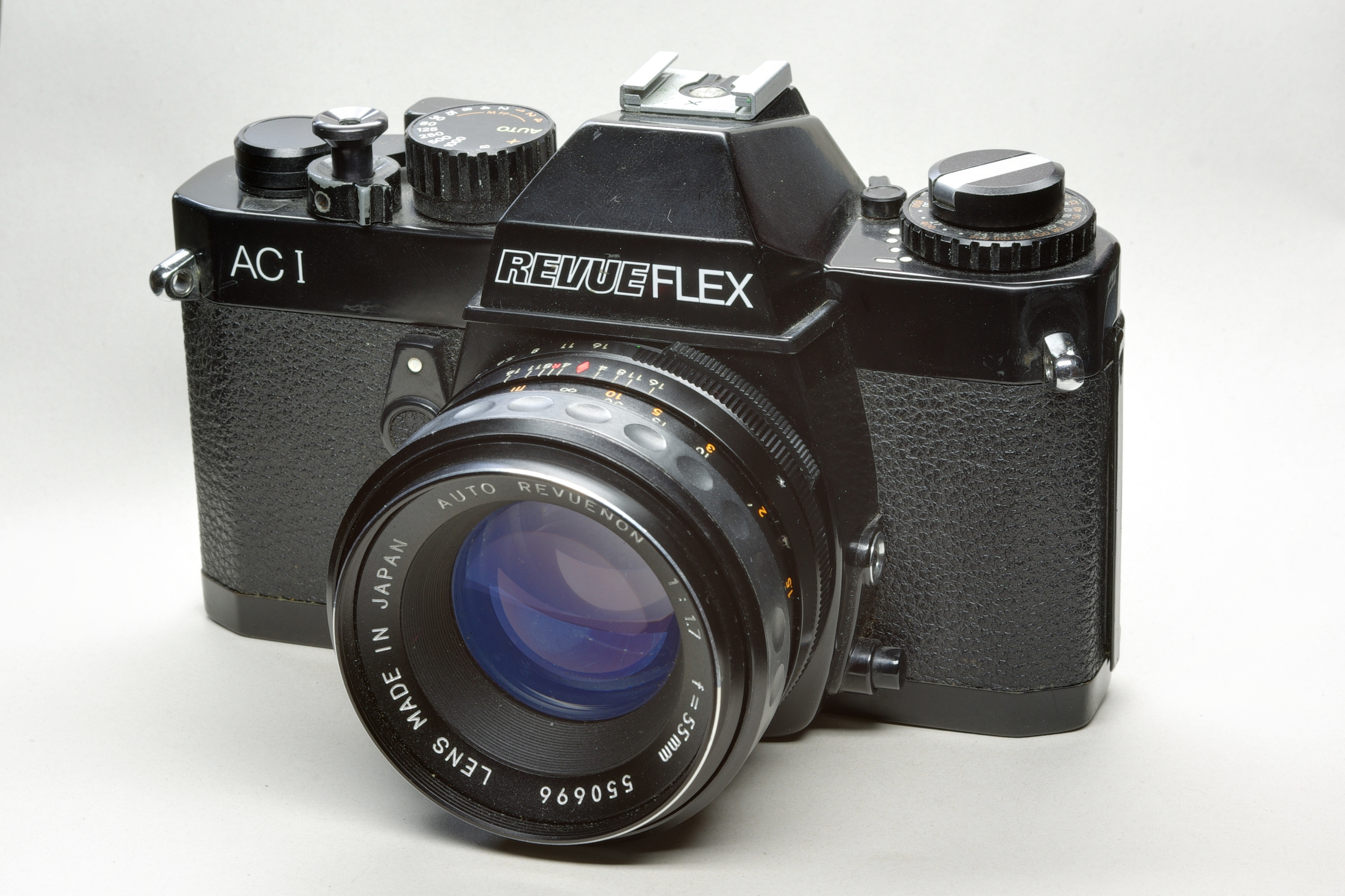
Chinon CE-3 memotron labeled as Revueflex AC 1

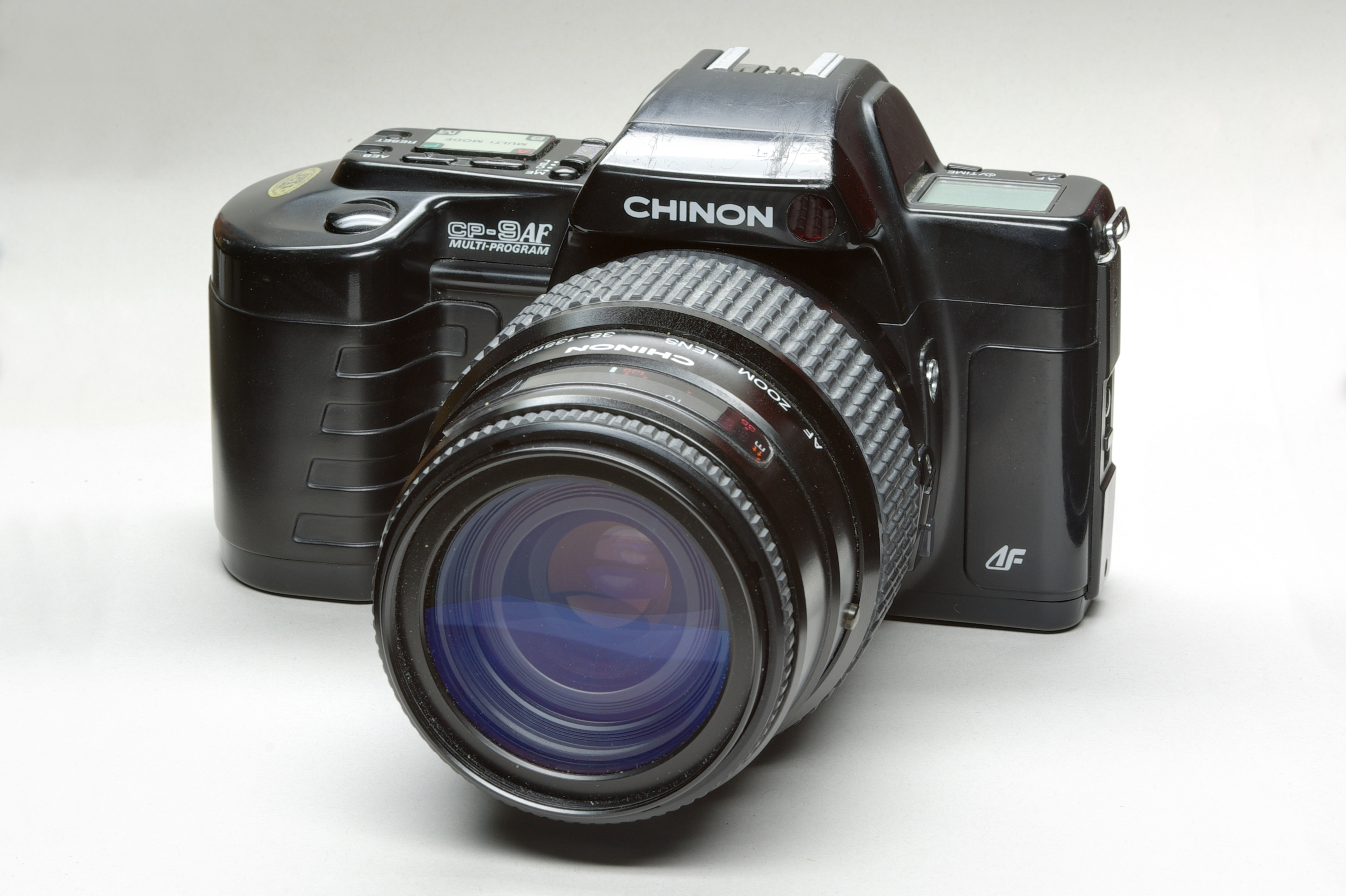
Chinon CP-9 AF with Autofocus lens 35-135mm

They manufactured several cameras, such as the CG-5, which was one of the first cameras ever to use an Auto Focus lens, which had to be bought separately. The lenses are now rare. They were cumbersome and had two infrared "eyes" on the top. They would connect by a bayonet fitting similar to the Pentax K fitting, except they also had electrical contacts which would power the motor at the press of the shutter release button.

Another popular camera was the CM-1, a basic, fully manual 35 mm SLR camera favored by student amateur photographers because it was cheaper than the rival Pentax K-1000, but could use the same lenses and accessories. The CM-1 featured a battery-powered through-the-lens light metering system that utilized a red-above, green-middle, and red-below to indicate whether the shutter speed/aperture setting was over/ok/under exposing the picture. It also used a split-image prism for determining when an image was properly focused. The CM-1 was sold through discount retailers such as K-Mart during the 1980s and proved to be very durable and reliable. Chinon branded products were sold in the UK through the Dixons high-street chain in the same period.

Most of Chinon's SLR cameras, such as the Chinon CE-5, used the Pentax K-mount, which was promoted by Pentax as a universal mount and therefore Pentax allowed and even encouraged other manufacturers to utilize their mount. This helped to expand the range of lens offerings for both Chinon and Pentax cameras. Several Chinon SLRs used the Pentax 42mm screw mount for the lens. Examples being the Chinon CS and the Memotron which were sold through Dixons. The CS had TTL metering and the Memotron had auto exposure with a handy system which allowed the user to take and retain a meter reading and save the exposure for a shot taken where the subject matter had been reframed.

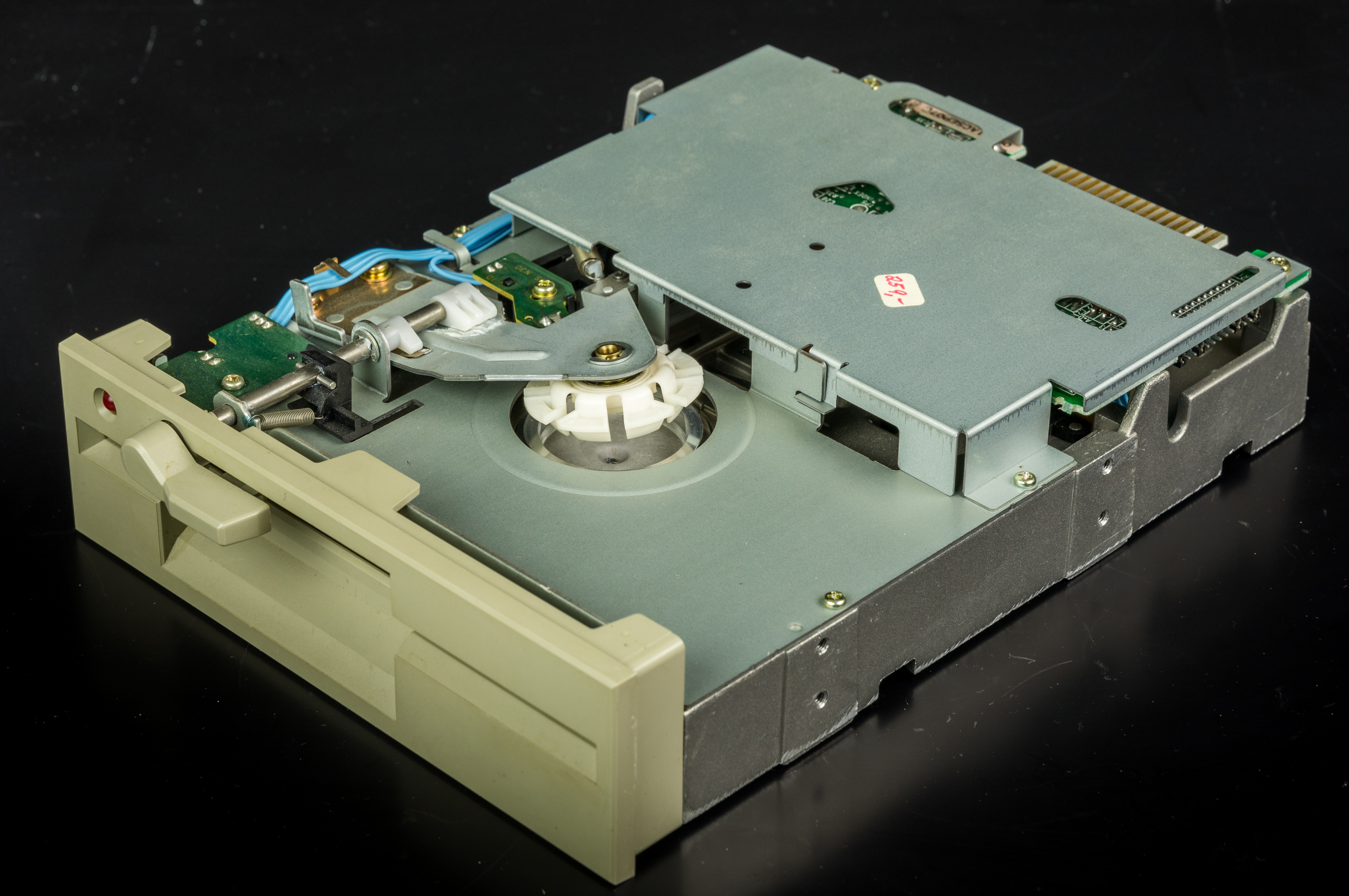
5.25" Floppy disk drive Chinon FZ-506

Chinon also was a manufacturer of CD-ROM drives, scanners, electronic pocket calculators, and floppy disk drives. They even entered the VR market with Cybershades for the PC, launched in the US market in 1995 for $199.

They produced a variety of both prime and zoom lenses for 35mm film cameras, commonly in the M42 mount or Pentax K mount. The focal lengths of the prime lenses include 28mm, 35mm, 50mm, 135mm, and 200m.
