= Minolta Maxxum 7000 =

35mm SLR camera model

Minolta 7000
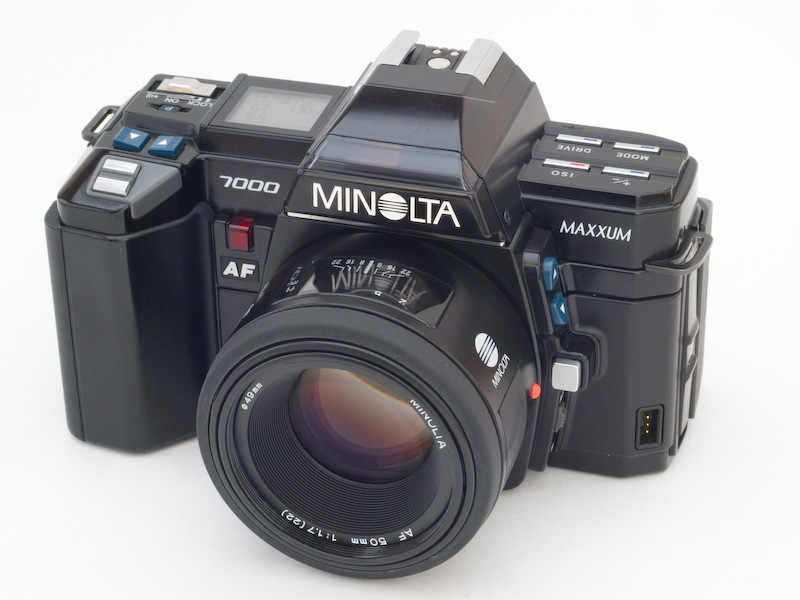

Overview
- Maker: Minolta
- Type: 35 mm SLR

Lens
- Lens mount: Minolta A-mount

Focusing
- Focus: TTL phase detecting autofocus

Exposure/metering
- Exposure: Program, aperture priority, shutter priority and depth-of-field autoexposure; match-needle 6 zone evaluative or 6.5% partial metering

Flash
- Flash: ISO

The Minolta MAXXUM 7000 (7000 AF in Europe and α-7000 in Japan) 35 mm SLR camera was introduced in February 1985. It was the first camera to feature both integrated autofocus (AF) and motorised film advance, the standard configuration for later amateur and professional single lens reflex cameras.

== Overview ==
The Minolta 7000 had both the AF sensor and the focus drive inside the camera body allowing the lenses to be smaller and cheaper than competitor's auto focus systems of the time. The Nikon F3AF (1983), Pentax ME F and Chinon CE-5 already had presented autofocus single lens reflex cameras but required the use of special motorised AF lenses. The Pentax ME F had focus sensors in the camera body, while the Chinon CE-5 used a lens with built-in active infrared sensors.

The aperture and focus were mechanically driven through the lens mount from the camera body. Electronic push buttons on the camera body replaced the mechanical aperture ring on the lens with the setting electronically displayed on the body and in the viewfinder. The metal body typical of older non-autofocus Minolta SLR cameras was replaced with a lighter body made of plastics. There was a 2 frame per second motor wind integrated into the body but in other respects the Maxxum 7000 offered most of the standard features of other cameras of the day, with the exception of a rather slow flash sync speed of 1/100 second.

As part of the new camera Minolta introduced a new lens mount, the A system, breaking compatibility with its earlier manual-focus MC and MD lenses rendering those lenses obsolete. Konica and Minolta merged their photo and camera businesses in October 2003 and in January 2006 Konica Minolta sold their camera and photo business to Sony. The A lens mount is still the same today with some modifications to the electronic contacts to facilitate new functions such as motor zoom (xi lenses, now discontinued) and a more sophisticated flash metering system (ADI).

== Autofocus ==
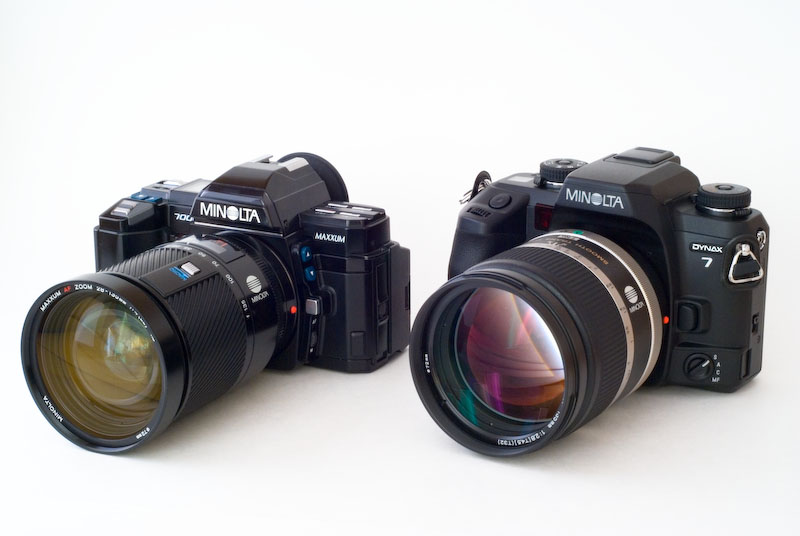
Maxxum 7000 next to a Maxxum/Dynax 7

When Pentax and Nikon entered the autofocus segment, both used a similar passive array AF system as Minolta, but retained compatibility with their existing manual-focus K and F mounts respectively. Canon, like Minolta, chose to change its mount completely, introducing the EOS 600-series a few years later, breaking compatibility with the former FL and FD lens mounts. Canon's EOS system was the only fully electronic lens mount system, with no mechanical connections between camera body and lens: the autofocus motors were housed in the lens itself, rather than the camera body.

== Legal troubles ==
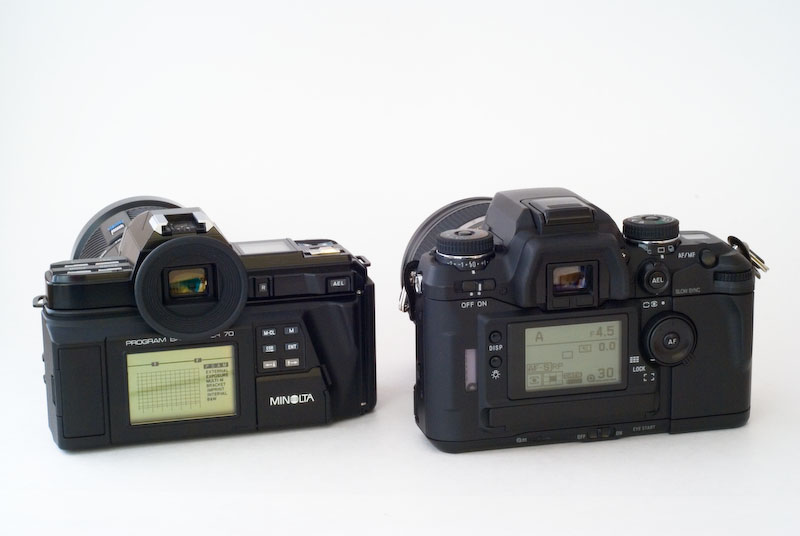
Maxxum 7000 (with optional "program back") next to a Maxxum/Dynax 7

Early Maxxum 7000 cameras were inscribed "MAXXUM 7000" with a crossed 'XX'. The oil giant Exxon considered this to be a violation of its trademark, because the XX in its logo was linked in a similar fashion. As a result, Minolta was allowed to distribute cameras that were already produced, but was forced to change the stylistic XX in Maxxum and implement this change in new production. All Maxxum cameras produced thereafter had a regularly scripted double 'X'.

Minolta's autofocus design was found to infringe the patents of Honeywell, a U.S. corporation. After protracted litigation, Minolta in 1991 was ordered to pay Honeywell damages, penalties, trial costs and other expenses in a final amount of $127.6 million.

Class	1985	1986	1987	1988	1989	1990	1991	1992	1993	1994	1995	1996	1997	1998	1999	2000	2001	2002	2003	2004	2005	2006
Higher flagship	9000 AF							9xi						9/9Ti								
Higher flagship																7						
Higher flagship																	7 Limited					
Lower flagship													800si									
Enthusiast	7000 AF				7000i																	
Enthusiast							8000i															
Enthusiast							7xi															
Enthusiast									700si													
Higher entry-Level		5000			5000i																	
Higher entry-Level								5xi														
Higher entry-Level										400si												
Higher entry-Level											500si			505si			5					
Higher entry-Level											600si classic			505si super								
Higher entry-Level																				70/60		
Lower entry-Level
Lower entry-Level					3000i																	
Lower entry-Level							3xi															
Lower entry-Level						2xi																
Lower entry-Level											300si				404si			4				
Lower entry-Level																			3			
Lower entry-Level																				50/40		
