= Konica Minolta Maxxum 5D =

Konica Minolta Maxxum/Dynax 5D
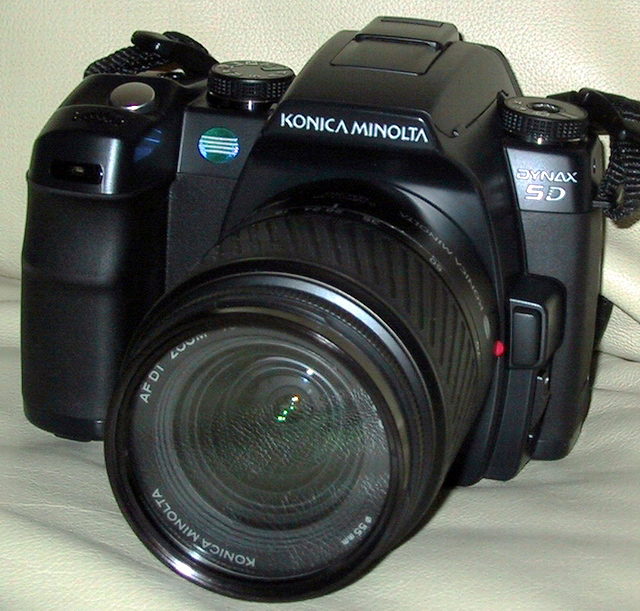

Overview
- Maker: Konica Minolta
- Type: Single-lens reflex

Lens
- Lens: Interchangeable via Minolta A-type bayonet mount

Sensor/medium
- Sensor: 23.5 × 15.7 mm CCD
- Maximum resolution: 3,008 × 2,000 (6.1 megapixels)
- Film speed: ISO 100, 200, 400, 800, 1600, 3200, and Auto
- Storage media: CompactFlash (CF) (Type I or Type II) or Microdrive

Focusing
- Focus modes: Single-Shot, Continuous, Auto, Manual
- Focus areas: TTL CCD line sensors (9-points, 8 lines with center cross-hair sensor)

Exposure/metering
- Exposure modes: Manual, Shutter-priority, Aperture-priority, Program, Auto, 5 scene modes (Portrait, Sports Action, Landscape, Sunset, Night Portrait)
- Exposure metering: EV 1 to 20 (at ISO 100 with F1.4 lens)
- Metering modes: 14-segment Honeycomb, Spot, Center Weighted

Flash
- Flash: Built-in pop-up with hotshoe

Shutter
- Shutter: Electronically controlled, vertical-traverse, focal-plane Shutter
- Shutter speed range: 1/4000 sec – 30 sec, or Bulb
- Continuous shooting: RAW / RAW+JPEG: 3 frame/s, up to 5 frames, JPEG Extra Fine: 3 frame/s, up to 12 frames, JPEG Fine: 3 frame/s, up to 15 frames, JPEG Standard: 3 frame/s, up to 19 frames

Viewfinder
- Viewfinder: Eye-level fixed pentaprism

Image processing
- Image processor: CxProcess
- White balance: Auto, 8 adjustable presets, Manual, Color temperature

General
- LCD screen: 2.5" TFT LCD, 122,000 pixels
- Battery: NP-400 Lithium-Ion rechargeable battery
- Weight: 590 g (21 oz) (1.30 lb)

The Konica Minolta Maxxum 5D (its North American market name; labelled Dynax 5D in Europe/Hong Kong and α-5 Digital and α Sweet Digital in Japan; officially named DG-5D) was a digital single-lens reflex camera introduced by Konica Minolta in 2005.

The camera has a sensor-shifting image stabilization feature inherited from the Konica Minolta Maxxum 7D.

== See also ==
- First frame black (a.k.a. "Error 58")

Level	Sensor	2004	2005	2006	2007	2008	2009	2010	2011		2012	2013	2014	2015	2016	2017	2018	2019	2020
Professional	Full frame						α900					α99				α99 II			
Professional	Full frame							α850											
High-end	APS-C		DG-7D			α700				α77				α77 II					
Midrange	APS-C									α65					α68				
Upper-entry	APS-C								α55		α57								
Upper-entry	APS-C				α100			α550 ^{F}	α580				α58						
Upper-entry	APS-C		DG-5D					α500	α560										
Upper-entry	APS-C							α450											
Entry-level	APS-C								α33	α35	α37								
Entry-level	APS-C					α350 ^{F}		α380	α390										
Entry-level	APS-C					α300		α330											
Entry-level	APS-C					α200		α230	α290										
Early models	Minolta 7000 with SB-70/SB-70S (1986) · Minolta 9000 with SB-90/SB-90S (1986) (Still video SLRs); Minolta MS-C1100 (1992) · Minolta RD-175 (1995)																		
Level	Sensor																		
Level	Sensor	2004	2005	2006	2007	2008	2009	2010	2011		2012	2013	2014	2015	2016	2017	2018	2019	2020
