= Canon L lens =

Camera lens manufactured by Canon

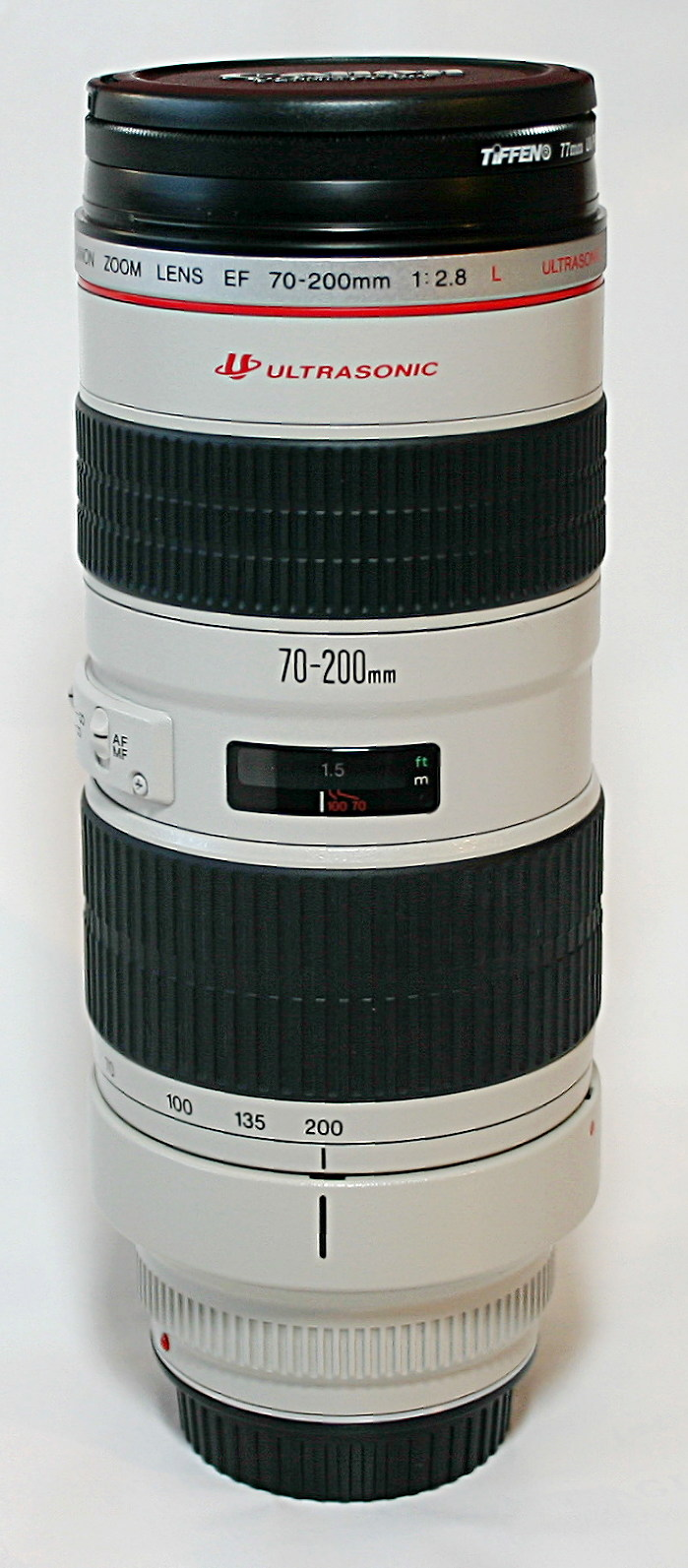
The 70-200 mm f/2.8L lens

Canon's series of L lenses (Luxury lenses) are a professional line of photography lenses made by Canon. Canon has sold zoom and prime L-series lenses for the discontinued FD lens mount, for the current EF lens mount used on all Canon EOS SLR cameras and for the RF mount used on mirrorless interchangeable-lens cameras.

== Characteristics ==
Canon L series lenses have a distinctive red ring around the lens barrel and the letter "L" after the lens name. Some models of L lenses utilize an infrared reflective heat shield coating. Most L series lenses share a number of common characteristics not found in Canon's line of lower-end lenses: L lenses tend to be more durable, incorporating dust and water-resistant rubber seals on some models, as well as featuring optics of higher quality, with many lenses containing aspherically ground, fluorite or ultra-low dispersion glass elements. Their front elements do not rotate for the proper operation of some filters, such as circular polarizers. L lenses are often "fast", with maximum apertures commonly f/2.8 or f/4, and, with the exception of the RF 100–500 mm f/4.5–7.1L IS USM lens and the RF 1200 mm f/8L IS USM lens, never exceeding f/5.6. Prime L lenses have a much larger maximum aperture, such as Canon's current 50mm and 85mm L lenses with maximum apertures of f/1.2. All current L-series lenses have ultrasonic autofocus motors (USM) with exceptions of RF 10–20mm f/4 L IS STM, RF 20 mm f/1.4L VCM, RF 24 mm f/1.4L VCM, RF 35 mm f/1.4L VCM, RF 50 mm f/1.4L VCM lens, and extra communication pins, except for the specialist tilt-shift lenses which do not provide auto focus.

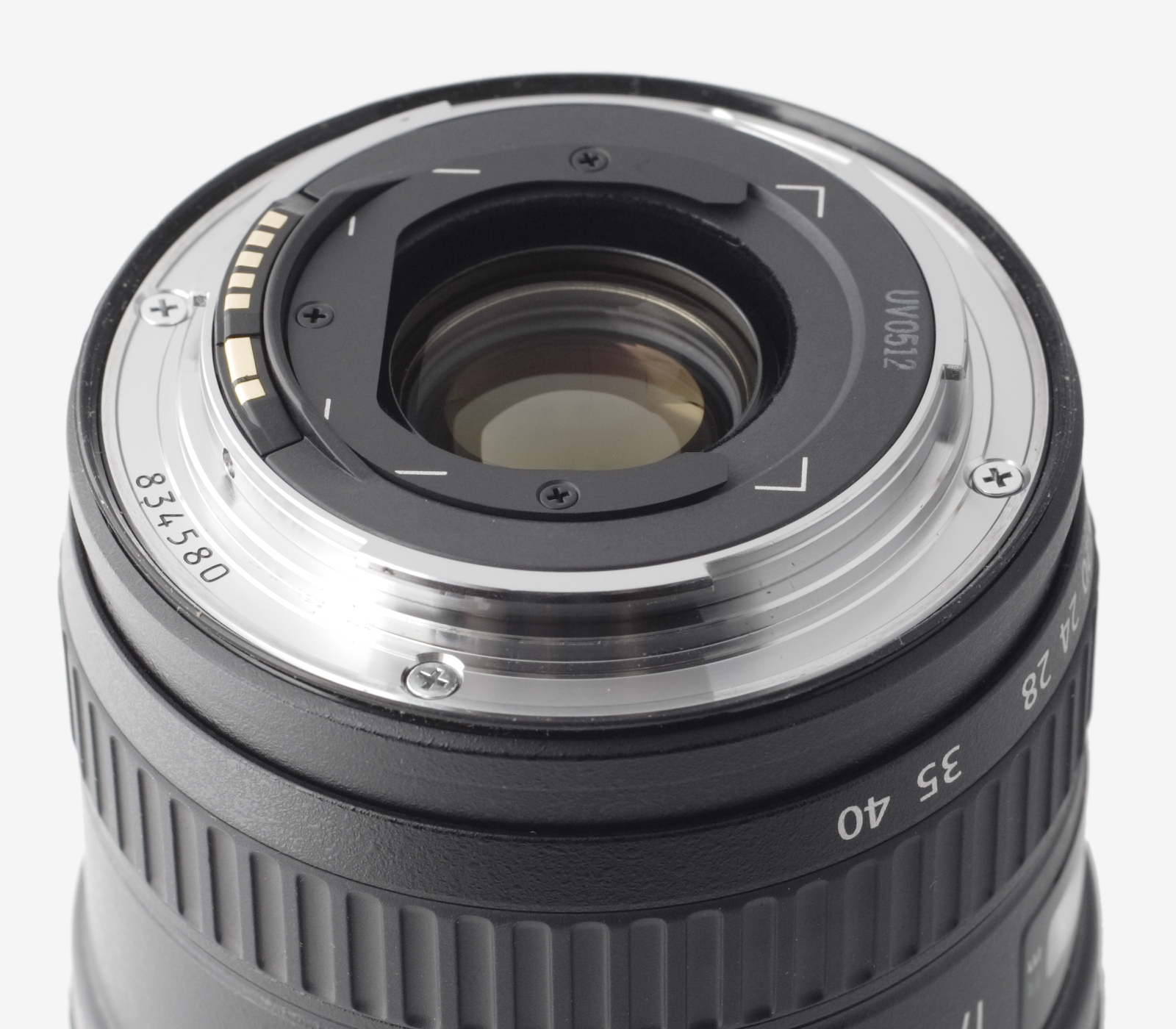
A gelatin filter holder, on the rear of an EF lens.

Larger sized L-lenses, such as the 70–200 mm, 100–400 mm zooms, and longer focal length primes (300 mm+), usually have an off-white barrel to reduce heat absorption under the sun that may otherwise affect the performance of the lens.

Wide angle L-lenses typically have a gelatin filter holder on the mounting collar of the lens, which allows a gelatin to be installed behind the lens. Some telephoto L-lenses, such as the EF 70-200mm zoom lenses, or the EF 300mm f/4L IS USM do not have rear gelatin filter holders. Super-telephoto lenses such as the EF 500mm f/4L IS USM, or the EF 200mm f/2L IS USM have a rear 52mm drop-in filter holder which can be used to hold gelatin type filters.

According to Canon, its L series lenses:

Incorporating specialized optical materials such as synthetic fluorite, Super UD and UD glass, and large-aperture high-precision aspherical lenses, only lenses that perform to the highest photographic standards are allowed to bear the designation ‘L’.

== Lenses ==
=== EF mount zoom lenses ===
Name	Category	Min focal length mm	Max focal length mm	Max aperture at min focal length f/	Max aperture at max focal length f/	Min focusing distance, m	Filter diameter, mm	Weight g	USM	IS	Current product
8–15mm f/4L USM Fisheye	Wide-angle	8	15	4	4	0.15	67	540			
11–24mm f/4L USM	Wide-angle	11	24	4	4	0.28	n/a	1180			
16–35mm f/2.8L USM	Wide-angle	16	35	2.8	2.8			600			
16–35mm f/2.8L II USM	Wide-angle	16	35	2.8	2.8			640			
16–35mm f/2.8L III USM	Wide-angle	16	35	2.8	2.8	0.28	82	790			
16–35mm f/4L IS USM	Wide-angle	16	35	4	4	0.28	77	615			
17–35mm f/2.8L USM	Wide-angle	17	35	2.8	2.8			545			
17–40mm f/4.0L USM	Wide-angle	17	40	4	4	0.28	77	500			
20–35mm f/2.8L	Wide-angle	20	35	2.8	2.8			570			
24–70mm f/2.8L USM	Standard	24	70	2.8	2.8			950			
24–70mm f/2.8L II USM	Standard	24	70	2.8	2.8	0.38	82	805			
24–70mm f/4L IS USM	Standard	24	70	4	4	0.38	77	600			
24–105mm f/4L IS USM	Standard	24	105	4	4	0.45	77	670			
24–105mm f/4L IS II USM	Standard	24	105	4	4	0.45	77	795			
28–70mm f/2.8L USM	Standard	28	70	2.8	2.8			880			
28–80mm f/2.8–4.0L USM	Standard	28	80	2.8	4			945			
28–300mm f/3.5–5.6L IS USM	Telephoto	28	300	3.5	5.6	0.7	77	1670			
35–350mm f/3.5–5.6L USM	Telephoto	35	350	3.5	5.6			1385			
50–200mm f/3.5–4.5L	Telephoto	50	200	3.5	4.5			690			
70–200mm f/4.0L USM	Telephoto	70	200	4	4	1.2	67	705			
70–200mm f/4.0L IS USM	Telephoto	70	200	4	4			760			
70–200mm f/4.0L IS II USM	Telephoto	70	200	4	4	1.0	72	780			
70–200mm f/2.8L USM	Telephoto	70	200	2.8	2.8			1310			
70–200mm f/2.8L IS USM	Telephoto	70	200	2.8	2.8			1470			
70–200mm f/2.8L IS II USM	Telephoto	70	200	2.8	2.8	1.2	77	1490			
70–200mm f/2.8L IS III USM	Telephoto	70	200	2.8	2.8	1.2	77	1440			
70–300mm f/4–5.6L IS USM	Telephoto	70	300	4	5.6	1.2	67	1050			
80–200mm f/2.8L	Telephoto	80	200	2.8	2.8			1330			
100–300mm f/5.6L	Telephoto	100	300	5.6	5.6			695			
100–400mm f/4.5–5.6L IS USM	Telephoto	100	400	4.5	5.6			1590			
100–400mm f/4.5–5.6L IS II USM	Telephoto	100	400	4.5	5.6	0.98	77	1570			
200–400mm f/4L IS USM 1.4x Extender	Telephoto	200	400	4	4			3620			

=== EF mount prime lenses ===
Name	Category	Focal length mm	Max aperture f/	Min focusing distance, m	Filter diameter, mm	Weight, g	USM	IS	Current product
14mm f/2.8L USM	Wide-angle	14	2.8						
14mm f/2.8L II USM	Wide-angle	14	2.8	0.2	n/a	645			
24mm f/1.4L USM	Wide-angle	24	1.4						
24mm f/1.4L II USM	Wide-angle	24	1.4	0.25	77	650			
35mm f/1.4L USM	Wide-angle	35	1.4	0.28	72	760			
35mm f/1.4L II USM	Wide-angle	35	1.4						
50mm f/1.0L USM	Standard	50	1						
50mm f/1.2L USM	Standard	50	1.2	0.45	72	645			
85mm f/1.2L USM	Medium telephoto	85	1.2						
85mm f/1.2L II USM	Medium telephoto	85	1.2	0.95	72	1025			
85mm f/1.4L IS USM	Medium telephoto	85	1.4	0.85	77	950			
135mm f/2.0L USM	Telephoto	135	2	0.9	72	750			
200mm f/1.8L USM	Telephoto	200	1.8						
200mm f/2.0L IS USM	Telephoto	200	2						
200mm f/2.8L USM	Telephoto	200	2.8						
200mm f/2.8L II USM	Telephoto	200	2.8						
300mm f/2.8L USM	Telephoto	300	2.8						
300mm f/2.8L IS USM	Telephoto	300	2.8						
300mm f/2.8L IS II USM	Telephoto	300	2.8	2.0	52	2400			
300mm f/4.0L USM	Telephoto	300	4						
300mm f/4.0L IS USM	Telephoto	300	4						
400mm f/2.8L USM	Super-telephoto	400	2.8						
400mm f/2.8L II USM	Super-telephoto	400	2.8						
400mm f/2.8L IS USM	Super-telephoto	400	2.8						
400mm f/2.8L IS II USM	Super-telephoto	400	2.8						
400mm f/2.8L IS III USM	Super-telephoto	400	2.8						
400mm f/5.6L USM	Super-telephoto	400	5.6						
500mm f/4.5L USM	Super-telephoto	500	4.5						
500mm f/4.0L IS USM	Super-telephoto	500	4						
500mm f/4.0L IS II USM	Super-telephoto	500	4						
600mm f/4.0L USM	Super-telephoto	600	4						
600mm f/4.0L IS USM	Super-telephoto	600	4						
600mm f/4.0L IS II USM	Super-telephoto	600	4						
600mm f/4.0L IS III USM	Super-telephoto	600	4						
800mm f/5.6L IS USM	Super-telephoto	800	5.6						
1200mm f/5.6L USM	Super-telephoto	1200	5.6						
100mm f/2.8L Macro IS USM	Macro	100	2.8	0.3	67	625			
180mm f/3.5L Macro USM	Macro	180	3.5	0.48	72	1090			
17mm f/4.0L Tilt-Shift	Tilt-shift	17	4						
24mm f/3.5L Tilt-Shift	Tilt-shift	24	3.5						
24mm f/3.5L II Tilt-Shift	Tilt-shift	24	3.5						
50mm f/2.8L Macro Tilt-Shift	Tilt-shift	50	2.8						
90mm f/2.8L Macro Tilt-Shift	Tilt-shift	90	2.8						
135mm f/4L Macro Tilt-Shift	Tilt-shift	135	4						

=== RF mount zoom lenses ===
Name	Category	Min focal length mm	Max focal length mm	Max aperture at min focal length f/	Max aperture at max focal length f/	Min focusing distance, m	Filter diameter, mm	Weight, g	USM	IS	Current product
10–20mm f/4L IS STM	Wide-angle	10	20	4	4	0.25	n/a	570			
14–35mm f/4L IS USM	Wide-angle	14	35	4	4	0.2	77	540			
15–35mm f/2.8L IS USM	Wide-angle	15	35	2.8	2.8	0.28	82	840			
24–70mm f/2.8L IS USM	Standard	24	70	2.8	2.8	0.21	82	900			
24–105mm f/4L IS USM	Standard	24	105	4	4	0.45	77	700			
24–105mm f/2.8L IS USM Z	Standard	24	105	2.8	2.8	0.45	82	1330			
28–70mm f/2L USM	Standard	28	70	2	2	0.39	95	1430			
70–200mm f/2.8L IS USM	Telephoto	70	200	2.8	2.8	0.7	77	1070			
70–200mm f/2.8L IS USM Z	Telephoto	70	200	2.8	2.8	0.49	82	1110			
70–200mm f/4L IS USM	Telephoto	70	200	4	4	0.6	77	695			
100–300mm f/2.8L IS USM	Telephoto	100	300	2.8	2.8	1.8	112	2590			
100–500mm f/4.5–7.1L IS USM	Telephoto	100	500	4.5	7.1	0.9	77	1530			

=== RF mount prime lenses ===
Name	Category	Focal length mm	Max aperture f/	Min focusing distance, m	Filter diameter, mm	Weight, g	USM	IS	Current product
5.2mm f/2.8L Dual Fisheye 3D VR	Wide-angle	5.2	2.8	0.002	n/a	352			
20mm f/1.4L VCM	Wide-angle	20	1.4	0.2	67	519			
24mm f/1.4L VCM	Wide-angle	24	1.4	0.24	67	515			
35mm f/1.4L VCM	Wide-angle	35	1.4	0.28	67	555			
50mm f/1.4L VCM	Standard	50	1.4	0.4	67	580			
50mm f/1.2L USM	Standard	50	1.2	0.14	77	950			
85mm f/1.2L USM	Medium telephoto	85	1.2	0.85	82	1195			
85mm f/1.2L USM DS	Medium telephoto	85	1.2	0.85	82	1195			
100mm f/2.8L Macro IS USM	Macro	100	2.8	0.26	67	730			
135mm f/1.8L IS USM	Telephoto	135	1.8	0.7	82	935			
400mm f/2.8L IS USM	Super-telephoto	400	2.8	2.5	52 (drop-in)	2890			
600mm f/4L IS USM	Super-telephoto	600	4	4.2	52 (drop-in)	3100			
800mm f/5.6L IS USM	Super-telephoto	800	5.6	2.6	52 (drop-in)	3140			
1200mm f/8L IS USM	Super-telephoto	1200	8	4.3	52 (drop-in)	3340			

=== Fixed zoom lenses ===
The Canon PowerShot Pro1 is the first in the Canon PowerShot family of point-and-shoot cameras to have an L-designated zoom lens ranging from 7.2 to 50.8 mm, equal to 28 to 200 mm in 35mm equivalent focal length. Its maximum aperture changes from f/2.4 to f/3.5, with focus driven by an ultrasonic motor.

== Canon lens codes ==
On the back of Canon lenses is a six-digit code, which indicates where the lens was manufactured and when.

Example of a code "UV1212"

The first letter, 'U', represents the factory that made the lens. Three possible first letters are:

U	=	Utsunomiya
F	=	Fukushima
O	=	Ōita

The second letter, 'V', represents the year of manufacture

A	=	1960,	1986,	2012
B	=	1961,	1987,	2013
C	=	1962,	1988,	2014
D	=	1963,	1989,	2015
E	=	1964,	1990,	2016
F	=	1965,	1991,	2017
G	=	1966,	1992,	2018
H	=	1967,	1993,	2019
I	=	1968,	1994,	2020
J	=	1969,	1995
K	=	1970,	1996
L	=	1971,	1997
M	=	1972,	1998
N	=	1973,	1999
O	=	1974,	2000
P	=	1975,	2001
Q	=	1976,	2002
R	=	1977,	2003
S	=	1978,	2004
T	=	1979,	2005
U	=	1980,	2006
V	=	1981,	2007
W	=	1982,	2008
X	=	1983,	2009
Y	=	1984,	2010
Z	=	1985,	2011

The next two digits represent the month the lens was manufactured.

The last two digits are for internal Canon use.

Therefore, the example (pictured) of UV0512 means the lens was made in the Utsunomiya, Japan factory in May 2007.

== See also ==
- Canon EF lens mount
- Canon RF mount
