= Canon EF 85mm lens =

Series of camera lenses manufactured by Canon

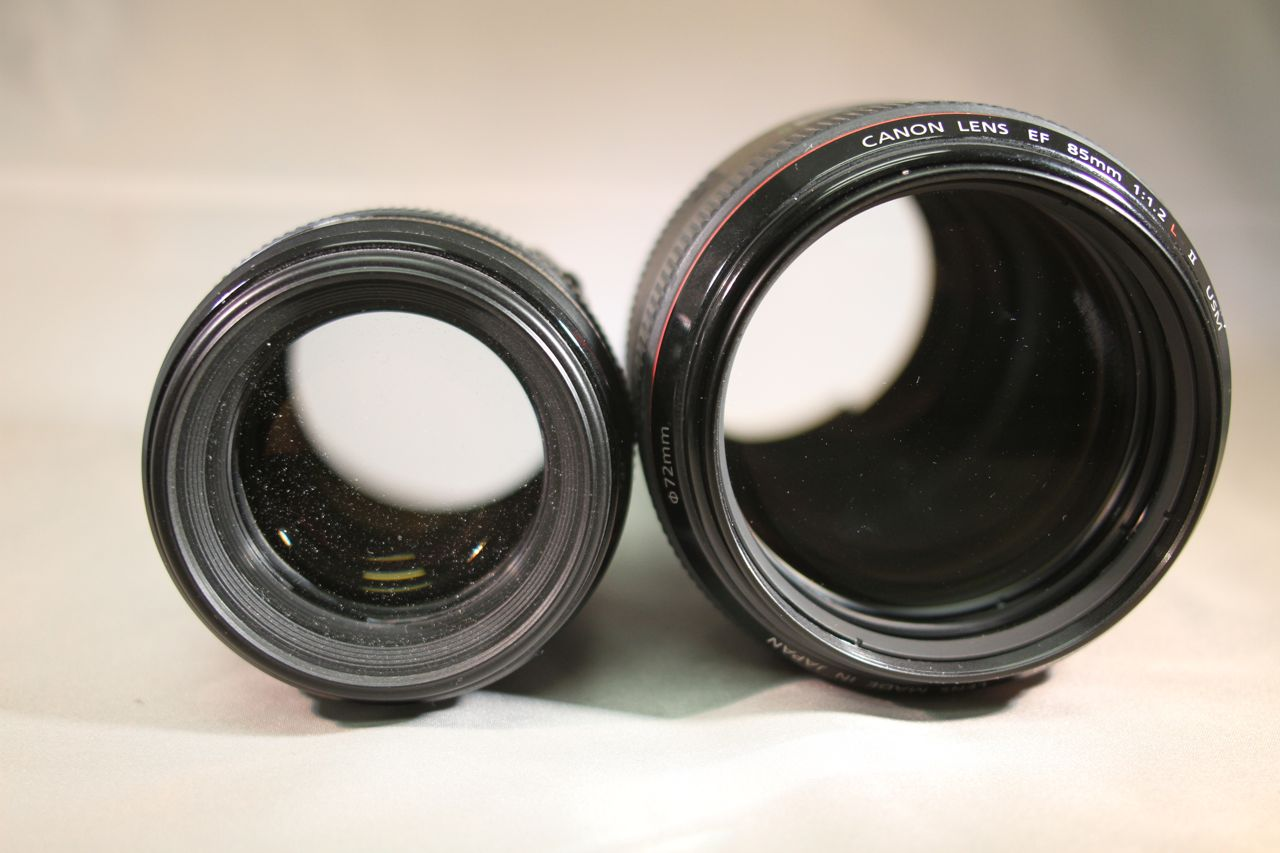
The 85mm f/1.8 (left) and the 85mm f/1.2L II (right)

The EF 85mm lenses are a group of medium telephoto prime lenses made by Canon Inc. that share the same focal length. These lenses have an EF type mount that fits the Canon EOS line of cameras.

This 85mm focal length is "perfect for portraiture" as labeled by Canon and practicing professionals, due to the focal length creating just the right perspective for both the subject and the background. The 85mm is most commonly used for head and shoulder type portraiture, upper torso portraiture and selective floral photography. It will commonly be found in the kits of photographers that shoot wedding, birthdays, and other events involving people. These photographers would also carry a 70-200mm for complementing the longer focal lengths and when extremely shallow depth of field is not needed.

== EF 85mm f/1.2L USM ==
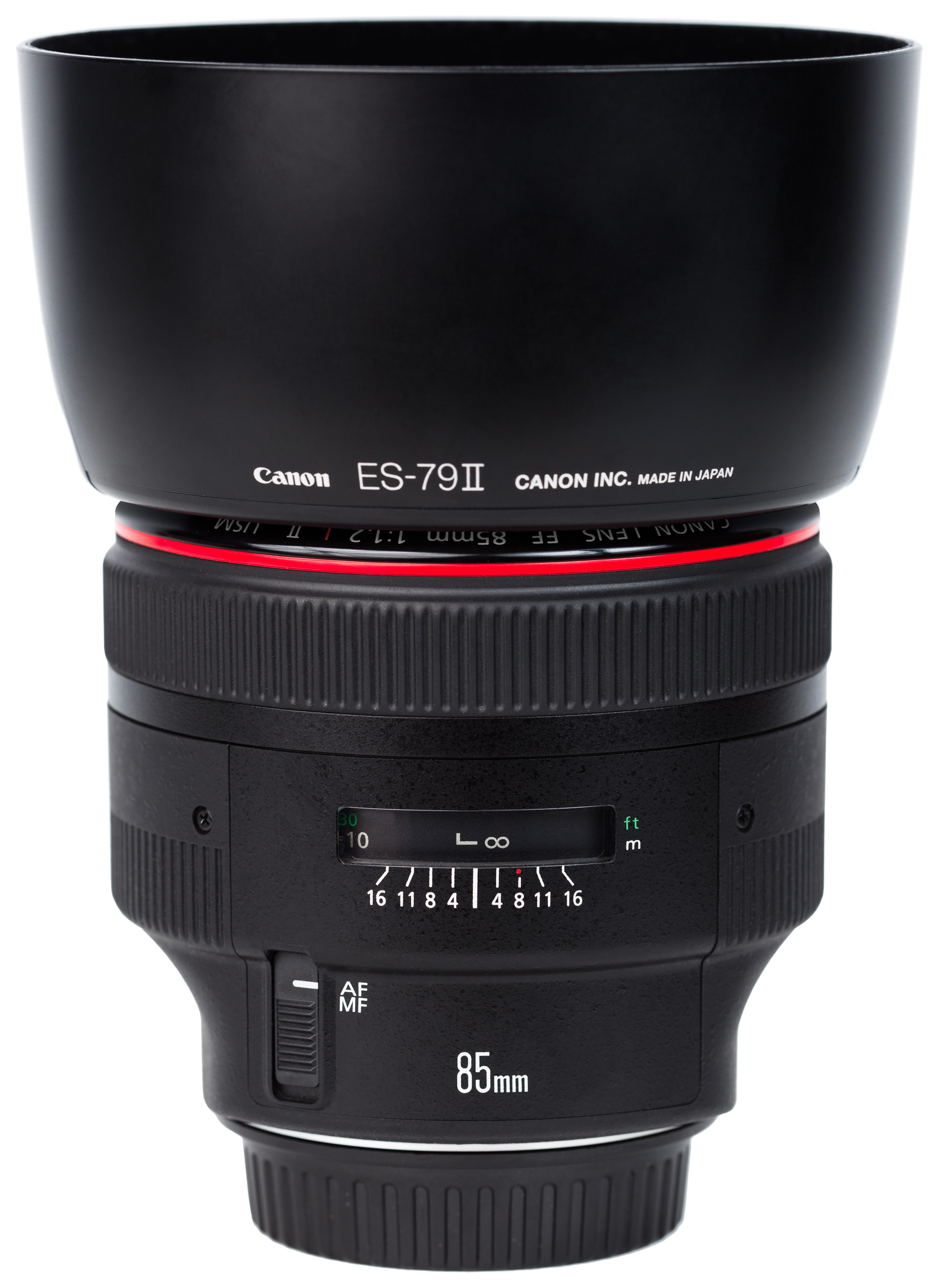
The Canon EF 85mm f1.2L II USM, with its included hood in place

The EF 85mm f/1.2L USM is a professional L series lens. Canon markets it as their "definitive portraiture lens".

The lead optical engineer at Canon who led the design team for this lens was a fashion photographer, and his intention was to design a lens that would be the definitive lens for fashion photography. This required a completely new design that would take a new direction from Canon's previous 85mm lens designs. A new element was placed in the lens to give bokeh that was unlike any of the other lenses that fashion photographers had used before. This new large element required a new clutched electronic manual focusing mechanism that was only used on Canon's 50mm f/1.0 to handle the large specialized element. When it finally hit the market, it was the only lens in the industry that was explicitly designed for fashion photography.

It is the longer of the only two f/1.2 lenses Canon makes, the other being the 50mm f/1.2L USM. This lens is constructed with a metal body and mount, and with rubber gripping and plastic extremities. It features a wide rubber focusing ring and a distance window with infrared index.

Featuring a circular 8-blade diaphragm, and a maximum aperture of f/1.2, this lens is capable of maintaining sharpness and image quality at low apertures. The lens' depth of field allows distinct focus on the subject, while providing a beautiful bokeh. The optical construction of this lens contains 8 lens elements, including one ground and polished aspherical lens element, which makes this lens extremely sharp when stopped down to about f/2. This lens uses a floating front extension focusing system, powered by a ring type USM motor. Auto focus speed of this lens is on the slow side when compared to most ring USM lenses, and photographing fast moving targets can be quite challenging with this lens. Manual focusing is done by wire: this lens does not have a direct mechanical connection to the focusing ring, but instead detects the rotation of the focusing ring and uses the autofocus motor to drive the lens elements. While full-time manual focus is available, the lens cannot be focused when the camera is off. The front of the lens does not rotate, but does extend when focusing.

== EF 85 mm f/1.2L II USM ==
The newer EF 85mm f/1.2L II USM version, which is aesthetically the same as the EF 85 mm f/1.2L USM, is updated with a newer CPU, 1.8 times faster autofocus, and upgraded anti-reflective lens coatings to reduce chromatic aberration, ghosting, and lens flare. This lens was used prominently in the independent feature film Marianne which was shot using a Canon EOS 7D.

== EF 85mm f/1.8 USM ==
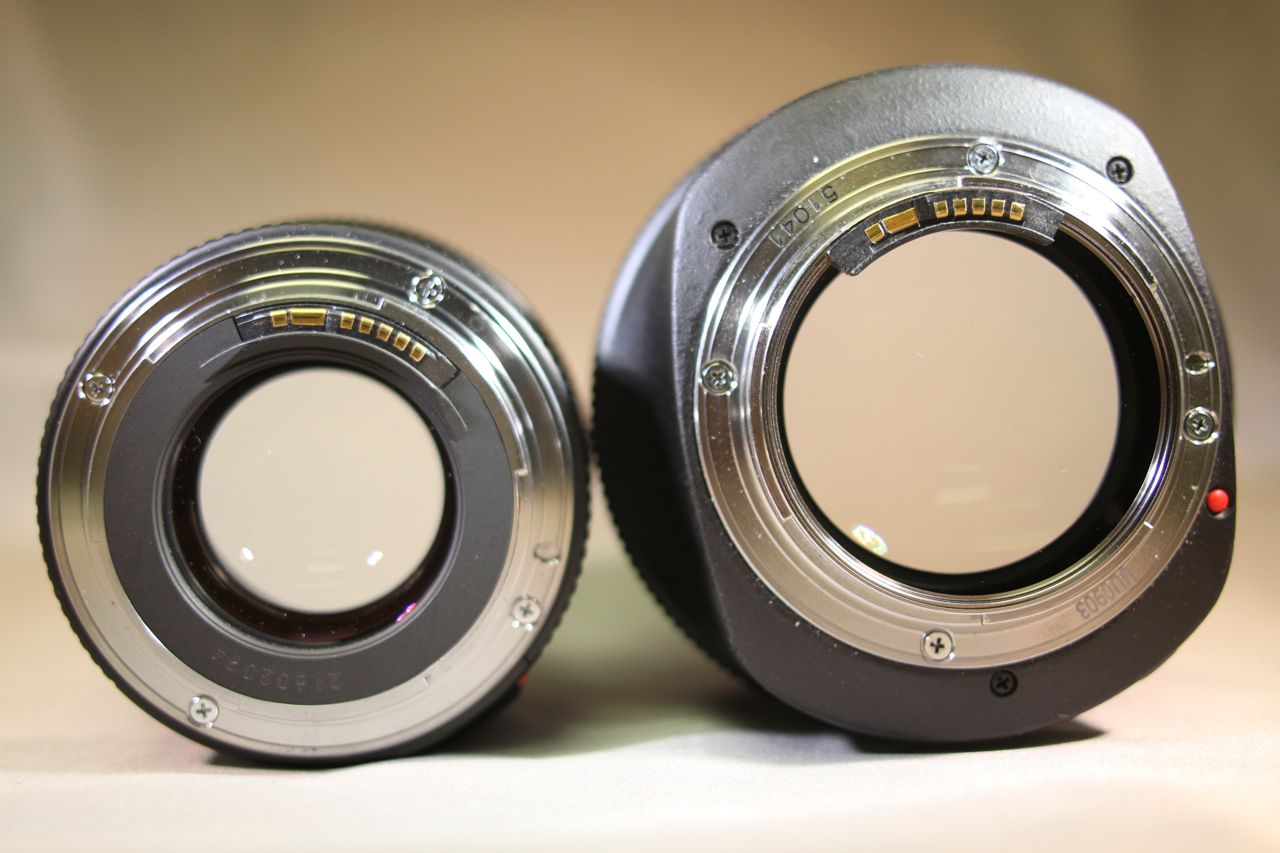
The EF mount for the f/1.8 and f/1.2L II lenses showing their wide apertures

The EF 85mm f/1.8 USM is a consumer level lens. It is the shorter sister to the EF 100mm f/2.0 USM, and is designed very similarly. It is constructed with a plastic body and a metal mount. This lens features a distance window with infrared index. An 8 blade, maximum aperture of f/1.8, gives this lens the ability to create depth of field effects. The optical construction of this lens contains nine lens elements, without any special lens elements. It uses an internal focusing system (meaning that the front of the lens neither rotates nor extends when focusing), powered by a ring type USM motor. Auto focus speed of this lens is very fast.

The plastic casing of the lens has changed over the lens's production. Starting with a smooth plastic (akin to early EOS cameras like the EOS 1000). Later the casing was changed to a textured matte plastic (much like the Canon EF 50mm f1.8 STM).

In addition to portraiture, the lens is also suited for indoor sports photography, particularly on a cropped sensor, due to its focal length, fast autofocus, and fast aperture, and for photos in social situations, due to its fast aperture (useful in dark interiors) and quiet operation (which minimizes disruption).

In terms of aberrations, the lens exhibits noticeable vignetting when used wide-open on full frame cameras, this is significantly reduced when used on a cropped sensor or when the lens is stopped down. The lens also generates purple fringing in high-contrast lighting, with subjects such as chrome, water, and black-and-white scenes. These aberrations are corrected by some cameras.

== EF 85mm f/1.4L IS USM ==
The EF 85mm f/1.4L IS USM is the latest addition to this series. It was announced on August 29, 2017. The lens has 1/3 of a stop less than the f/1.2 siblings, but the image stabilization gives sharp pictures with up to four stops' longer exposure. The f/1.2 versions thus have a slight edge in reduced depth-of-field and reducing subject motion blur, while the f/1.4 IS has a huge advantage in low light.

== Specifications ==
Attribute	f/1.2L USM	f/1.2L II USM	f/1.8 USM	f/1.4L IS USM
Image				
Key features
Full-frame compatible	Yes Yes			
Image stabilizer	No No			Yes Yes
Ultrasonic Motor	Yes Yes			
L-series	Yes Yes		No No	Yes Yes
Diffractive Optics	No No			
Macro	No No			
Technical data
Aperture (max-min)	f/1.2 – f/16		f/1.8 – f/22	f/1.4 – f/22
Construction	7 groups / 8 elements		7 groups / 9 elements	10 groups / 14 elements
# of diaphragm blades	8			9
Closest focusing distance	3.1 ft / 0.95m		2.7 ft / 0.85 m	2.7 ft / 0.85 m
Max. magnification	0.11× (1:9.1)		0.13× (1:7.7)	0.13× (1:7.7)
Horizontal viewing angle	24°			
Diagonal viewing angle	28°30'			
Vertical viewing angle	16°			
Physical data
Weight	2.25 lb / 1025 g		0.93 lb / 425 g	2.09 lb / 950 g
Maximum diameter	3.6 in / 91.5 mm		3.0 in / 75.0 mm	3.5 in / 88.6 mm
Length	3.3 in / 84.0 mm		2.8 in / 71.5 mm	4.15 in / 105.4 mm
Filter diameter	72 mm		58 mm	77 mm
Accessories
Lens hood	ES-79II		ET-65III	ET-83E
Case	LP1219		LP1014	LP1219
Retail information
Release date	September 1989	March 2006	July 1992	August 2017
MSRP $	$1500	$2199	$430	$1599.00
Street Price $		$1700	$380	
Used Price $			circa $200 (2019)	

== See also ==
- Canon EF Portrait Lenses
- Canon EF 200mm lens
- Canon EF 135mm lens
- Canon EF 100mm lens
- Canon EF 50mm lens
- Canon EF 35mm lens
- Canon EF 24mm lens
- Canon EF 14mm lens
