= Canon EF 35mm lens =

Canon SLR EF mount prime lens

The Canon EF 35mm lenses are a family of wide angle prime lenses with EF mount made by Canon Inc. The family also includes one EF-S lens that only mounts on Canon bodies with APS-C sensors.

Focal lengths at 35mm or less are considered wide angle on 135 film and full-frame digital bodies. This focal length is commonly used for group portraits, landscapes, street photography, and general purpose photography, due to its relatively wide-angle views and low distortion characteristics.

Four EF and one EF-S 35mm lenses have been developed. Two of these are L series lenses. Three of the five lenses are currently available (the f/1.4L II USM, the f/2 IS USM and the EF-S f/2.8 Macro IS STM).

- f/1.4L USM
- f/1.4L II USM
- f/2
- f/2 IS USM
- EF-S f/2.8 Macro IS STM

Due to the crop factor of Canon APS-C (1.6x) and APS-H (1.3x) sensors, all of the 35mm lenses have an equivalent focal length of 56mm and 45.5mm respectively.

== EF 35mm f/1.4L USM ==
The EF 35mm f/1.4L USM is a professional L series lens. It is constructed with a metal body. Features of this lens are a wide rubber focus ring that is damped, and a distance window with infrared index. The maximum aperture of f/1.4 gives this lens the ability to create shallow depth of field and smooth bokeh effects. The optical construction of this lens contains 11 lens elements in 9 groups, including one ground and polished aspherical lens element. It uses a rear floating focusing system, powered by a ring type USM motor. Autofocus speed of this lens is very fast, and the front of the lens neither rotates nor extends when focusing.

== EF 35mm f/1.4L II USM ==
The EF 35mm f/1.4L II USM is a successor of the EF 35mm f/1.4L USM. It was announced at the 27th of August 2015 and is available since October same year. The EF 35mm f/1.4L II USM lens is the first lens in Canon line up to use a Blue Spectrum Refractive Optics element (BR element) to reduce the chromatic aberration at the blue end of the spectrum. This results in a better optical quality. Further it has, according to Canon, an improved weather sealing. On other hand it is roughly 20 mm longer and 180 g heavier.

== EF 35mm f/2 ==
The EF 35mm f/2 is a prosumer level lens. It is constructed with a plastic body and a metal mount. This lens features a distance window with infrared index. The maximum aperture of f/2 gives this lens the ability to create depth of field effects, but not to the same shallowness of the EF 35mm f/1.4L USM, while its five-blade diaphragm may produce background blur (bokeh). The optical construction of this lens contains seven lens elements, without any special lens elements. It uses a linear extension focusing system, powered by an AFD motor. Auto focus speed of this lens is moderately fast, but focusing does make some sound. The front of the lens does not rotate when focusing, but does extend.

== EF 35mm f/2 IS USM ==
The EF 35mm f/2 is an enthusiast-level lens. Like the original version of the f/2 lens, it has a plastic body and a metal mount, but adds image stabilization. It also has an eight-blade diaphragm with rounded blades, as opposed to the eight non-rounded blades of the f/1.4L lens and the five non-rounded blades of the original f/2 model. This lens features a distance window with infrared index. The optical construction of this lens contains 10 elements in 8 groups, including one molded aspherical element. It uses a ring-type USM motor. The front of the lens neither rotates nor extends when focusing.

== EF-S 35mm f/2.8 Macro IS STM ==
The EF-S 35 mm f/2.8 Macro IS STM, like all other EF-S lenses, can only be mounted to a Canon camera with EF-S mount and not to a camera with EF mount. The lens has image stabilization and uses a Stepping motor for the focus. It is the first 35mm lens from Canon with macro capability. It supports a magnification up to 1:1, and also includes a built-in ring light.

== Specifications ==
Attribute	EF f/1.4L USM	EF f/1.4L II USM	EF f/2	EF f/2 IS USM	EF-S f/2.8 Macro IS STM
Image		Canon EF35mm f/1.4L II USM			
Key features
Full-frame compatible	Yes Yes				No No
Image stabilizer	No No			Yes Yes	
Ultrasonic Motor	Yes Yes		No No	Yes Yes	No No
Stepping Motor	No No				Yes Yes
L-series	Yes Yes		No No		
Environmental Sealing	No No	Yes Yes	No No		
Diffractive Optics	No No				
Macro	No No				Yes Yes
Technical data
Maximum aperture	1.4		2		2.8
Minimum aperture	22				32
Horizontal viewing angle	54°				35°55'
Diagonal viewing angle	63°				42°35'
Vertical viewing angle	38°				24°20'
Groups/elements	9/11	11/14	5/7	8/10	6/10
# of diaphragm blades	8	9	5	8	7
Closest focusing distance	1.0 ft/0.3 m	0.92 ft/0.28 m	0.8 ft/0.25 m	0.79 ft/0.24 m	0.13 m (5.1 in)
Max. magnification	0.18×	0.21×	0.23×	0.24×	1×
Physical data
Weight	1.27 lb/580 g	1.67 lb/760 g	0.46 lb/210 g	0.74 lb/335 g	190 g (6.7 oz)
Maximum diameter	3.1 "/79.0 mm	3.2 "/80.4 mm	2.7 "/67.4 mm	3.1 "/77.9 mm	69.2 mm (2.72 in)
Length	3.4 "/86.0 mm	4.2 "/105.5 mm	1.7 "/42.5 mm	2.5 "/62.6 mm	55.8 mm (2.20 in)
Filter diameter	72 mm		52 mm	67 mm	49 mm (attached to Hood)
Accessories
Lens Caps	E-72 II		E-52 / E-52 II	E-67 II	EF-S35
Lens hood	EW-78C	EW-77B	EW-65 II	EW-72	ES-27
Case	LP1219		LP1011	LP1116	LP1014
Retail information
Release date	December 1998	August 2015	October 1990	December 2012	April 2017
Currently in production?	No No	Yes Yes	No No	No No	No No
MSRP $	$1479	$1799	$320	$600	$349.99
Street Price $	$1200		$220	$600	

== See also ==
- Canon EF 200mm lens
- Canon EF 135mm lens
- Canon EF 100mm lens
- Canon EF 85mm lens
- Canon EF 50mm lens
- Canon EF 40mm lens
- Canon EF 24mm lens
- Canon EF 14mm lens
