= Canon EF 35–350mm lens =

35 mm camera lens

EF 35–350mm f/3.5–5.6L USM
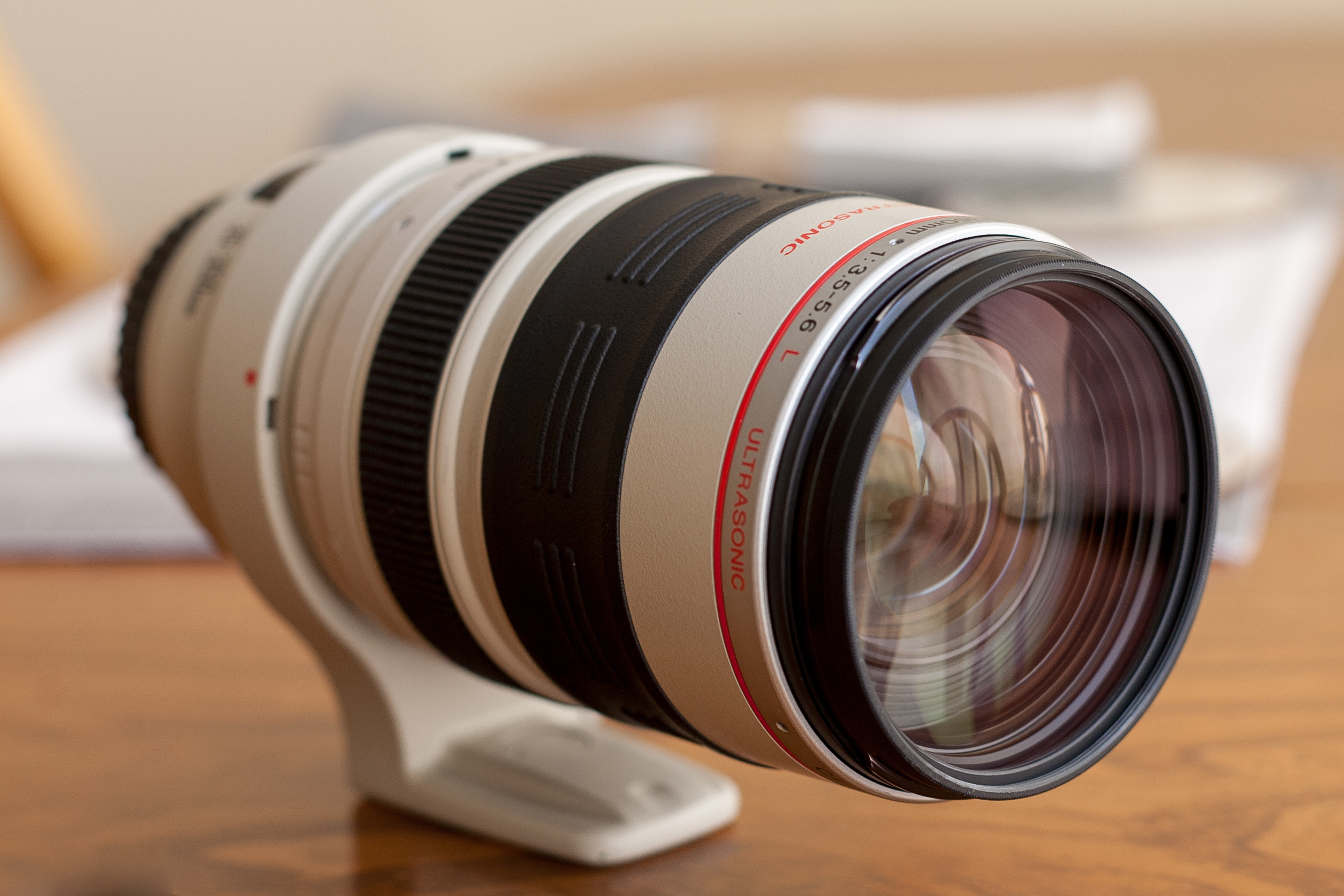
- The Canon EF 35-350mm f/3.5-5.6L USM
- Maker: Canon

Technical data
- Type: Zoom
- Focus drive: Ultrasonic motor
- Focal length: 35–350mm
- Crop factor: 1.0
- Aperture (max/min): f/3.5–5.6 – f/22–32
- Close focus distance: 0.6 m
- Max. magnification: 0.25
- Diaphragm blades: 8
- Construction: 21 elements in 15 groups

Features
- Lens-based stabilization: No No
- Unique features: L-Series
- Application: Telephoto zoom

Physical
- Max. length: 167.4 mm
- Diameter: 85 mm
- Weight: 1,385 g
- Filter diameter: 72 mm

Accessories
- Lens hood: EW-78 / EW-78 II
- Case: LH-D22

Angle of view
- Horizontal: 54° - 6°
- Vertical: 38° - 4°
- Diagonal: 63° - 7°

History
- Introduction: January 1993
- Discontinuation: June 2004
- Successor: Canon EF 28–300mm

The EF 35–350mm f/3.5–5.6L USM lens is a discontinued telephoto zoom lens manufactured by Canon.

This lens has an EF type mount, that fits the Canon EOS line of cameras. It was introduced in January 1993. Featuring the highest zoom ratio (10x) of any interchangeable SLR lens at the time, the lens was and is popular among photojournalists. It has now been superseded by the Canon EF 28–300mm lens. When used on a digital EOS body with a field of view compensation factor of 1.6x, such as the Canon EOS 7D, it provides a narrow field of view, equivalent to a 56–560mm lens mounted on a 35mm frame body.

The lens contains 21 elements in 15 groups. As an L-series lens, it features two ultra-low dispersion (UD) elements, and utilizes Canon's ring USM for fast and silent focusing. It has a push-pull zoom design with the possibility to lock the lens at the desired focal length. The lens exhibits strong barrel distortion and chromatic aberration at the wide end. On an APS-C body, the lens shows almost no vignetting, even at its maximum aperture, f/5.6, at 350mm.

== See also ==
- Canon EOS
- Canon EF lens mount
- Canon L lens
