= Tamron 28-300mm F/3.5-6.3 Di VC PZD =

- Maker: Tamron
- Lens mount(s): Canon EF, Nikon F, Sony/Minolta Alpha

Technical data
- Type: Zoom
- Focus drive: Ultrasonic
- Focal length: 28-300mm
- Aperture (max/min): f/3.5 - f/6.3
- Close focus distance: 0.49 metres (1.6 ft)
- Max. magnification: 0.29
- Diaphragm blades: 7
- Construction: 19 elements in 15 groups

Features
- Weather-sealing: Partial
- Lens-based stabilization: Yes Yes
- Aperture ring: No No

Physical
- Max. length: 182.60 millimetres (7.189 in)
- Diameter: 74 millimetres (2.9 in)
- Weight: 540 grams (1.19 lb)
- Filter diameter: 67mm

Accessories
- Lens hood: HA010

Angle of view
- Diagonal: 75゜23' - 8゜15'

History
- Introduction: 2014
- Discontinuation: July 2018 (Sony); July 2020 (Canon, Nikon)

Retail info
- MSRP: $849 USD

The Tamron 28-300mm F/3.5-6.3 Di VC PZD (Model A010) is an interchangeable superzoom full-frame DSLR camera lens announced by Tamron on February 6, 2014 and released in late June 2014 for the Canon and Nikon mounts and on 30 October 2014 for the Sony mount.

The Sony version, released later than the Canon and Nikon variants and discontinued earlier than the other two, does not feature image stabilization (or "Vibration Compensation", "VC", as Tamron calls it) since the relevant Sony cameras that the lens is compatible with feature in-body image stabilization.

The lens supports full-time manual focus in both autofocus (AF) as well as in manual focus (MF) modes.

== See also ==
- Canon EF 28-300mm lens — a similar, older, heavier, more expensive first-party lens for Canon DSLR cameras by Canon
