= Canon RF 70–200mm lens =

Camera lens

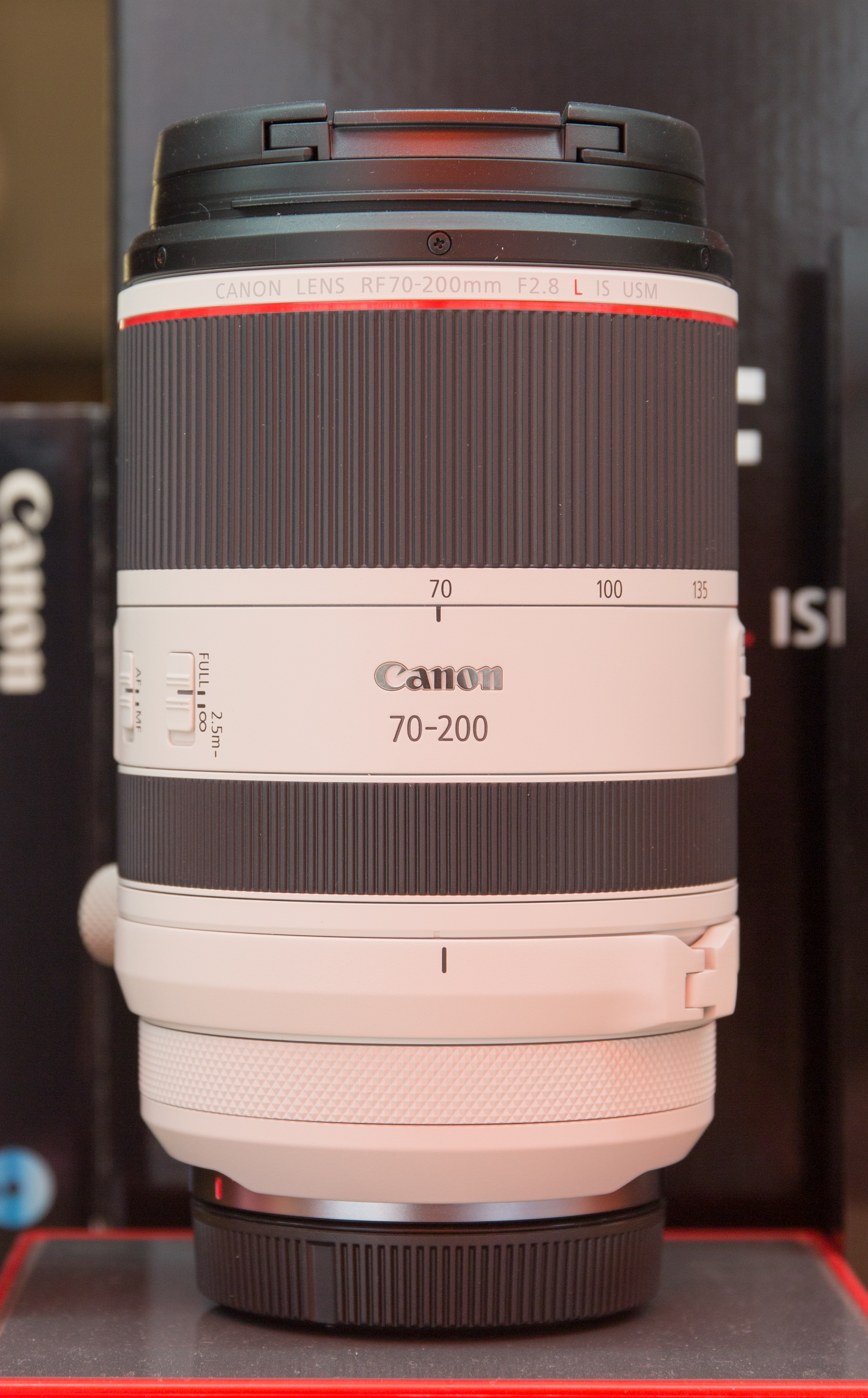
Canon RF70-200mm F2.8 L IS USM

The RF 70–200mm lenses are a group of telephoto zoom full-frame lenses made by Canon. The lenses have an RF mount to work with the R line of cameras.

The lens comes in three different versions, all of which have fixed maximum aperture at all focal lengths, and are L-series lenses.

- f/4L IS USM
- f/2.8L IS USM
- f/2.8L IS USM Z

== Common fields of application ==
The f/4 USM is popular among weight-sensitive landscape photographers and hobbyists who want L lens quality without spending thousands of dollars. The f/2.8 versions are popular among event photographers and photojournalists where the lens's lower light capabilities are required. Some portrait photographers also prefer this lens because the fast aperture produces more background blur and bokeh.

The 70–200mm focal length range is considered practically essential for professional and serious amateur photography. It covers a superset of the classic 85–135mm portrait focal length range, making it ideal for framing subjects from full-body portraits at 70mm to tight headshots at 200mm. For video and hybrid shooters, key selection criteria include minimal focus breathing, smooth focus ring action, and consistent aperture throughout the zoom range.

== Design philosophy ==
The RF 70–200mm f/4 and f/2.8 (non-Z) versions employ an extending (telescoping) barrel design, which allows each lens to be significantly shorter when set to the 70mm end of the zoom range compared to traditional internally-zooming designs. This approach was a deliberate departure from Canon's previous EF-mount equivalents and allows the lenses to fit upright in many camera bags. The trade-off of the extending design is that it rules out compatibility with Canon RF teleconverters (extenders) on the f/4 and original f/2.8 versions, and may raise concerns about long-term dust and moisture sealing of the extending mechanism over time.

All three lenses include a Control Ring — a feature unique to Canon RF lenses — which can be assigned to control aperture, ISO, exposure compensation, or other settings directly on the lens barrel.

== Versions ==
=== f/2.8L IS USM ===
The RF 70-200mm F2.8L IS USM was announced in October 2019 and released in February 2019, completing Canon's "holy trinity" of essential RF-system zoom lenses alongside the RF 15–35mm f/2.8L and RF 24–70mm f/2.8L. The lens is 27% shorter and 28% lighter than the equivalent EF-mount predecessor, the EF 70-200mm f/2.8L IS III USM, while maintaining comparable optical quality.

The optical design comprises 17 elements in 13 groups, including a Super UD element and a UD element to minimise chromatic aberration, and two aspherical elements to correct spherical aberration. Autofocus is driven by dual Nano USM motors, which provide fast, smooth, and quiet operation suited to both stills and video. The lens received an EISA Award for 2020–2021.

Image quality has been described by reviewers as outstanding, with sharpness in the centre of the frame peaking at f/4, and pleasing results even wide open at f/2.8. A notable limitation of this version is incompatibility with Canon's RF teleconverters (extenders), a consequence of the extending optical design.

=== f/4L IS USM ===
The RF 70-200mm F4L IS USM was announced in November 2020 and is Canon's shortest and lightest 70-200mm f/4 lens. At 695 g (1.532 lb) and 119 mm (4.7 in) in length when collapsed, it is approximately 26mm shorter and nearly 400g lighter than the f/2.8 version and has been noted to be of similar dimensions to a standard drinks can.

The optical design uses 16 elements in 11 groups, incorporating four UD elements to minimise chromatic aberrations, and an Air Sphere Coating on selected elements to suppress backlit flare and ghosting. The lens uses dual Nano USM focus motors, providing extremely fast, quiet, and accurate autofocus suitable for continuous tracking at high burst rates. Image stabilisation is rated at 5 stops on its own, or up to 7.5 stops in combination with the in-body image stabilisation of the EOS R5 and R6.

Like the f/2.8 version, the f/4L IS USM does not support RF teleconverters due to the extending optical design.

=== f/2.8L IS USM Z ===
The RF 70-200mm F2.8L IS USM Z was announced on 30 October 2024 and is the newest member of the family. Unlike the original f/2.8L IS USM, it uses an internal (non-extending) zoom design, maintaining a fixed physical length throughout the zoom range. This redesign allows compatibility with Canon's RF Extender 1.4× and RF Extender 2×, enabling focal lengths up to 400mm — a significant advantage over the non-Z version.

The "Z" designation indicates compatibility with the Canon Power Zoom Adapter PZ-E2 and PZ-E2B, which attach to dedicated mounting points and electrical contacts on the lens body and provide motorised control of the zoom ring — an approach that brings cinema-lens-style zoom control to the still photography lens. The Z version is considered one of the leading choices for hybrid stills and video photographers requiring a telephoto zoom with professional video-oriented features. The adapter can be controlled remotely via Canon's Camera Connect and EOS Utility applications, or via the Browser Remote function. A manual aperture ring with a clickless option — compatible with the EOS R5 II and EOS R1 — enables smooth, stepless aperture transitions for video recording. The lens also features weather-sealed electrical contacts and is available in both black and white variants. Canon states the lens exhibits minimal focus breathing, with optimal performance on camera bodies that support in-body breathing correction.

The optical design consists of 15 elements in 18 groups and includes 11 diaphragm blades. The lens has been described by reviewers as the sharpest interchangeable zoom lens they have tested, surpassing even the already highly regarded non-Z predecessor. The original f/2.8L IS USM remains in Canon's product lineup alongside the Z version.

== 35-mm-equivalent focal lengths on cameras with smaller sensors ==
When used with a Canon APS-C (1.6x crop) Mirrorless camera, the 35-mm-equivalent focal lengths of these lenses are 112–320mm on an APS-C sensor and 91–260mm on an APS-H sensor. This is due to the crop factor inherent with APS-C sensor mirrorless digital cameras.

== Specifications ==
Attribute	f/2.8L IS USM Z	f/2.8L IS USM	f/4L IS USM
Image			
Key features
Image stabilizer	Yes Yes, 5.5 stops	Yes Yes, 5 stops	
Environmental Sealing	Yes Yes		
Ultrasonic Motor	Yes Yes		
L-series	Yes Yes		
Diffractive Optics	No No		
Macro	No No		
Control Ring	Yes Yes		
Zoom Type	Rotary (internal)	Rotary (extending)	
Technical data
Maximum aperture	f/2.8		f/4.0
Minimum aperture	f/22	f/32	
Horizontal viewing angle	29° – 10°		
Vertical viewing angle	19°30' – 7°		
Diagonal viewing angle	34° – 12°		
Groups/elements	15/18	13/17	11/16
# of diaphragm blades	11	9	9
Closest focusing distance	0.49 m (1.6 ft)	0.7 m (2.3 ft)	0.6 m (2.0 ft)
Maximum Magnification	.30×	.23×	.28×
Physical data
Weight without tripod	White Model:1,115 g (2.458 lb) Black Model:1,110 g (2.45 lb)	1,070 g (2.36 lb)	695 g (1.532 lb)
Maximum diameter	88.5 mm (3.48 in)	89.9 mm (3.54 in)	83.5 mm (3.29 in)
Length	199 mm (7.8 in)	146 mm (5.7 in)	119 mm (4.7 in)
Filter diameter	82 mm	77 mm	77 mm
Accessories
Lens hood	Cylindrical (ET-88C)	Cylindrical (ET-83F)	Cylindrical (ET-83G)
Retail information
Release date	30 October 2024	14 February 2019	4 November 2020
Currently in production?	Yes Yes	Yes Yes	Yes Yes
MSRP US$	$2999	$2700	$1599

== See also ==
- Canon RF lens mount
- Canon L lens
- Telephoto lens
- Zoom lens
- Image stabilization
