= Canon EF 70-300mm lens =

Canon SLR EF-mount zoom lens

The EF 70–300mm lenses are a series of telephoto zoom lenses made by Canon Inc. They have a Canon EF lens mount to work with the EOS line of cameras.

Four Canon EF telephoto zoom lenses carry the 70–300mm designation.

- EF 70–300mm f/4.5–5.6 DO IS USM
- EF 70–300mm f/4–5.6L IS USM
- EF 70–300mm f/4–5.6 IS USM
- EF 70–300mm f/4–5.6 IS II USM

All versions offer image stabilization (IS) and ultrasonic motor drive (USM) and have nearly the same maximum aperture of 4/4.5 to 5.6 over their entire focal range.

== EF 70–300mm f/4.5–5.6 DO IS USM ==
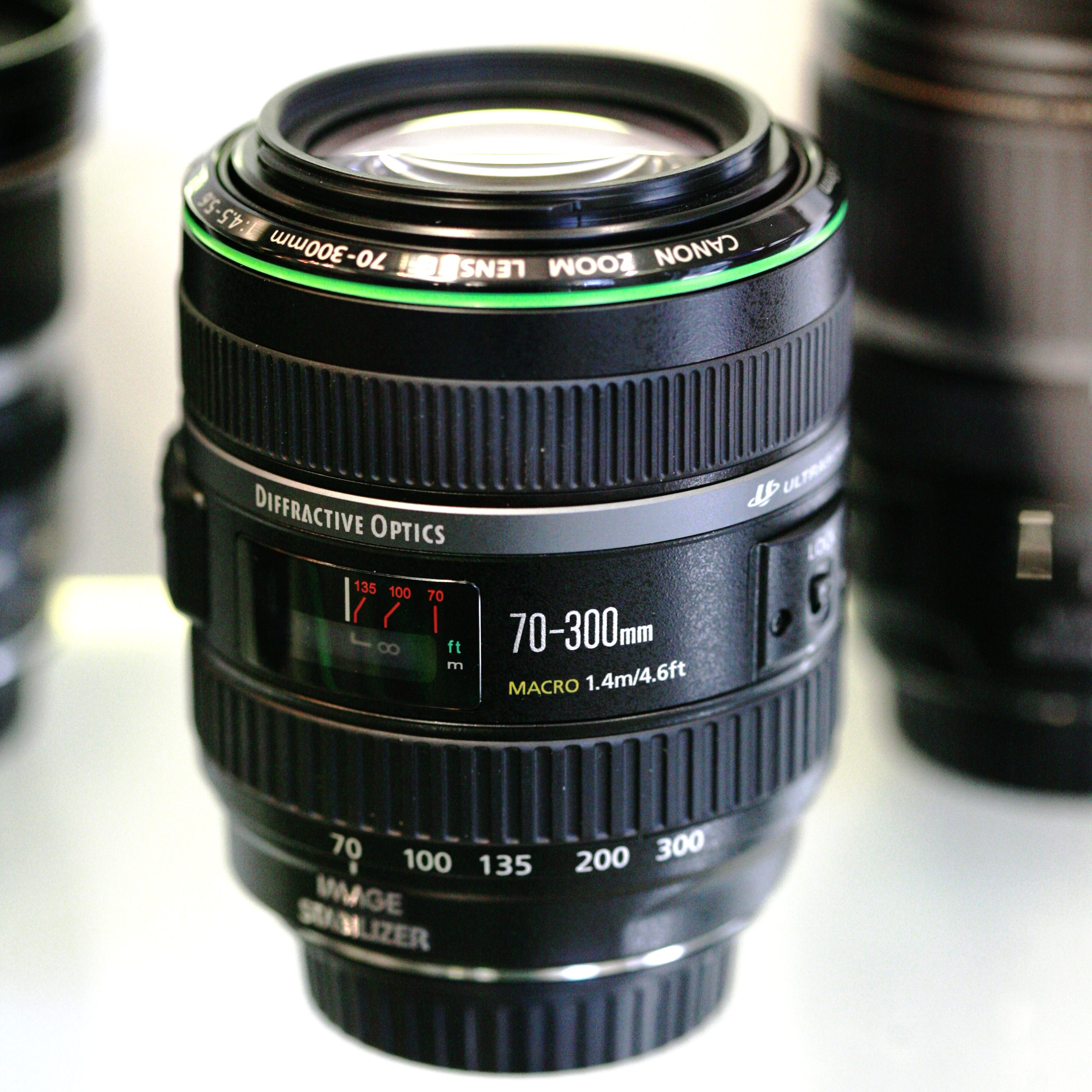
The EF 70–300mm f/4.5–5.6 DO IS USM lens

This lens makes use of Canon's Diffractive optics rather than a traditional lens of wholly refractive design. This allows the lens to be more compact, albeit heavier and much more expensive than a lens of conventional design. The lens contains Image Stabilization and a ring USM, which allows full-time manual focusing of the lens while using the camera in single shot mode. This lens offers good optical quality with the caveat that the diffractive element does not deal with strong incident light sources as well as conventional designs.

This lens is compatible with the Canon ET-65B lens hood.

== EF 70–300mm f/4–5.6 IS USM ==
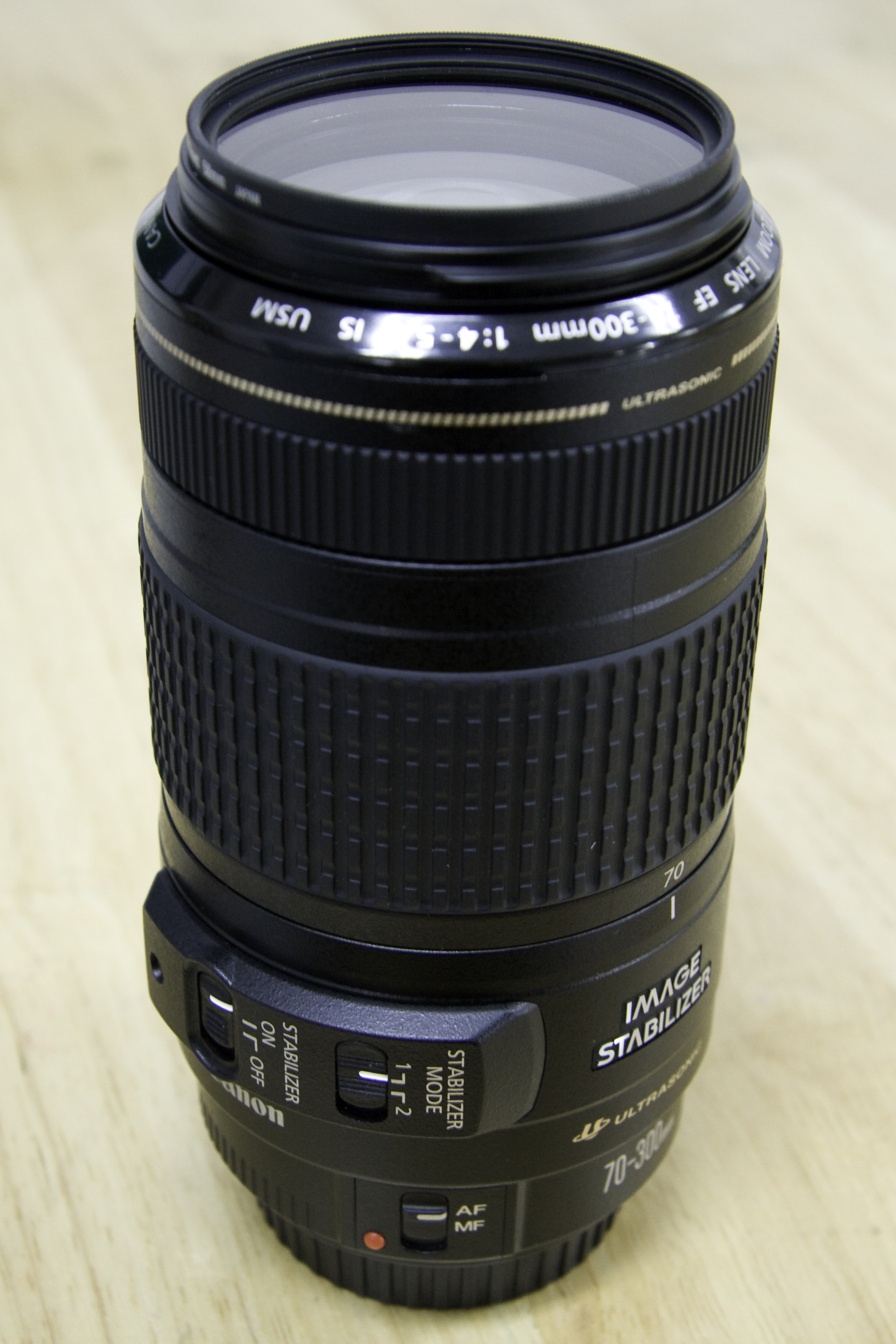
The EF 70–300mm f/4–5.6 IS USM lens with an optional filter attached.

This lens is of a conventional design and was introduced in 2005, to offer an increase in performance from the earlier 75-300mm lenses in the Canon EF lens lineup. Like the 70–300mm f/4.5–5.6 DO it contains an image stabilizer; however, for focusing it uses the lower quality micro-USM design, and therefore requires the focus motor to be disengaged before manual focusing. The optical performance of this lens is competitive to Canon's L series telephoto zoom lenses, such as the 70–200mm series of lenses. This is because it features an ultra-low dispersion glass element, something that is uncommon for a consumer grade lens, and is usually found only in Canon's L-series lenses. This lens is also notable for having only a slight decrease in performance as the focal length goes beyond 200 mm. That is an uncommon attribute of consumer grade zoom lenses and is not the case for the old 75–300mm lens.

This lens is compatible with the Canon ET-65B lens hood.

== EF 70–300mm f/4–5.6L IS USM ==
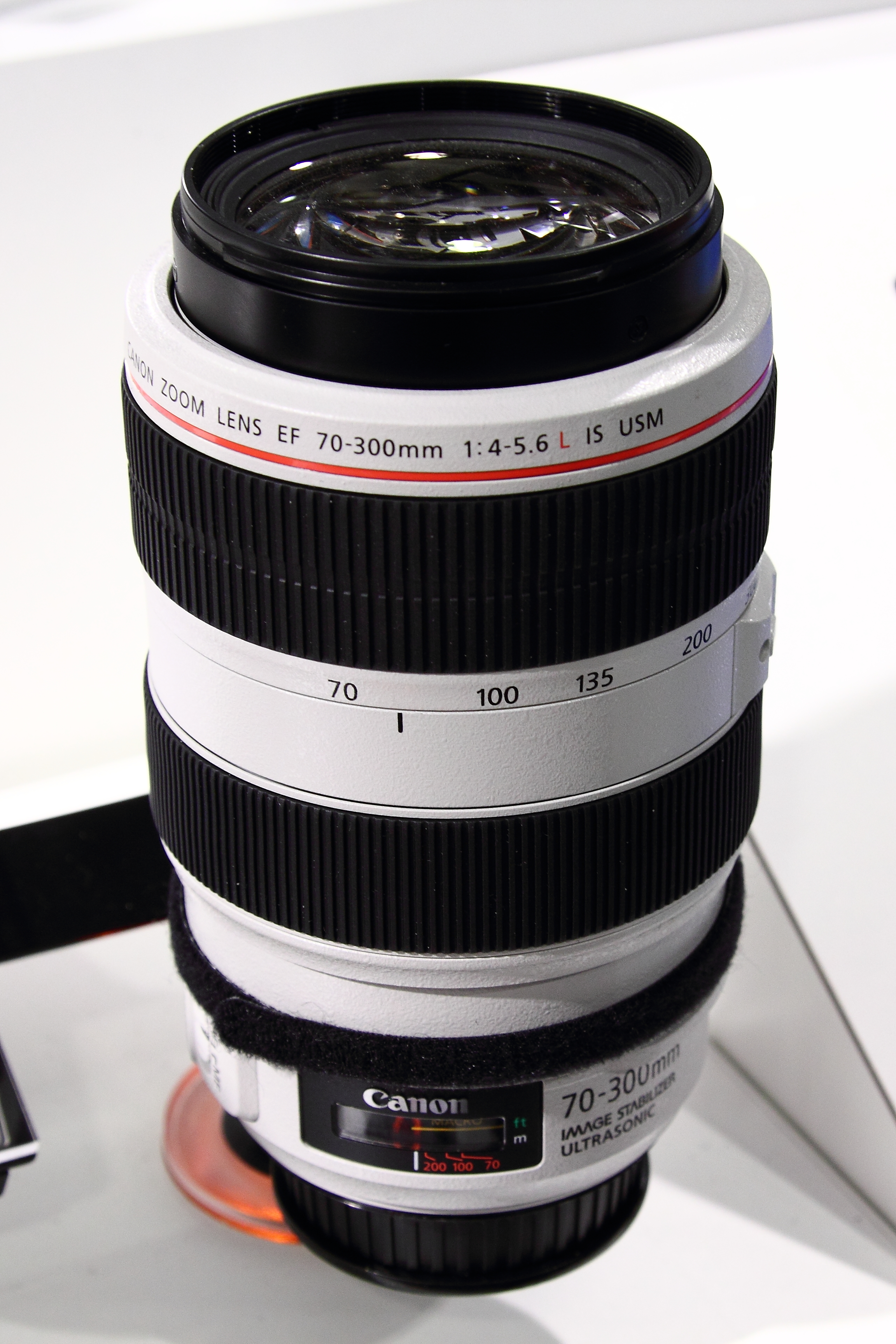
The EF 70–300mm f/4–5.6 L IS USM lens

Introduced on 26 August 2010, this lens is in Canon's L-series range of professional lenses. The lens includes 19 elements in 14 groups, two of which are ultra-low dispersion (UD) glass. It is designed to provide professional photographers the 70–300mm zoom range without sacrificing high image quality. The 70–300mm f/4–5.6L IS USM is the only L-series 70–300mm lens and is the only to feature weather sealing. The image stabilizer is rated for 4 stops and allows sharp pictures to be taken handheld at speeds as slow as 1/8 of a second. This lens has superb contrast that meets or exceeds other L-series telephoto zooms, but lacks in sharpness in the corners throughout most of its focal length range. The image quality at 300mm does not degrade, making it distinct from the other 70–300mm lenses. Barrel distortion is average for this class of lens, but vignetting is better than average. Because of its fast autofocus, useful range, excellent image stabilization, and high image quality, the 70–300mm f/4–5.6L has recently become popular among serious amateur and professional photographers. The 70–300mm f/4–5.6L includes a hood but not a tripod ring.

== EF 70–300mm f/4–5.6 IS II USM ==
Introduced on 15 September 2016, Canon EF 70-300mm f/4-5.6 IS II USM lens is the second Canon lens equipped with Nano USM technology, a focusing motor that combines the benefits of a ring USM (ultrasonic motor) for high-speed AF during still photo shooting and lead-screw type STM (stepping motor) for smooth and quiet video autofocusing (AF). The lens also features a new LCD information display and four-stop image stabilization. It was available in November 2016, for an estimated retail price of $549.99. To support this new lens, some Canon cameras needed a new firmware.

== Specifications ==
Attribute	f/4.5–5.6 DO IS USM	f/4–5.6 IS USM	f/4–5.6L IS USM	f/4–5.6 IS II USM
Image stabilizer	Yes, 3rd generation		Yes, 4th generation	
Environmental Sealing	No		Yes	No
Ring USM	Yes	No	Yes	No
Micro USM	No	Yes	No	
Nano USM	No			Yes
L-series	No		Yes	No
Diffractive Optics	Yes	No		
Ultra-low dispersion glass element	No	Yes		
Macro	No			
Maximum aperture	f/4.5–5.6	f/4–5.6		
Minimum aperture	f/32–38, f/32–40 (1/3-stop increments)	f/32–45		
Weight	720 g	630 g	1050 g	710 g
Max. Diameter x Length	82.4 × 99.9 mm	76.5 × 142.8 mm	89 × 143 mm	80 × 146 mm
Filter diameter	58 mm		67 mm	
Horizontal viewing angle	29°–6°50'			
Vertical viewing angle	19°30'–4°35'			
Diagonal viewing angle;	34°–8°15'			
Groups/elements	12/18	10/15	14/19	12/17
# of diaphragm blades	6	8		9
Closest focusing distance	1.4 m	1.5 m	1.2 m	
Maximum Magnification	0.19×	0.25×	0.21×	0.25×
Lens hood	ET-65B		ET-73B	ET-74B
Release date	January 2004	August 2005	October 2010	September 2016
MSRP US$	$1,149.88	$549.00	$1,349.00	$549.00
