= Canon EF 100-300mm lens =

Canon SLR EF-mount zoom lens

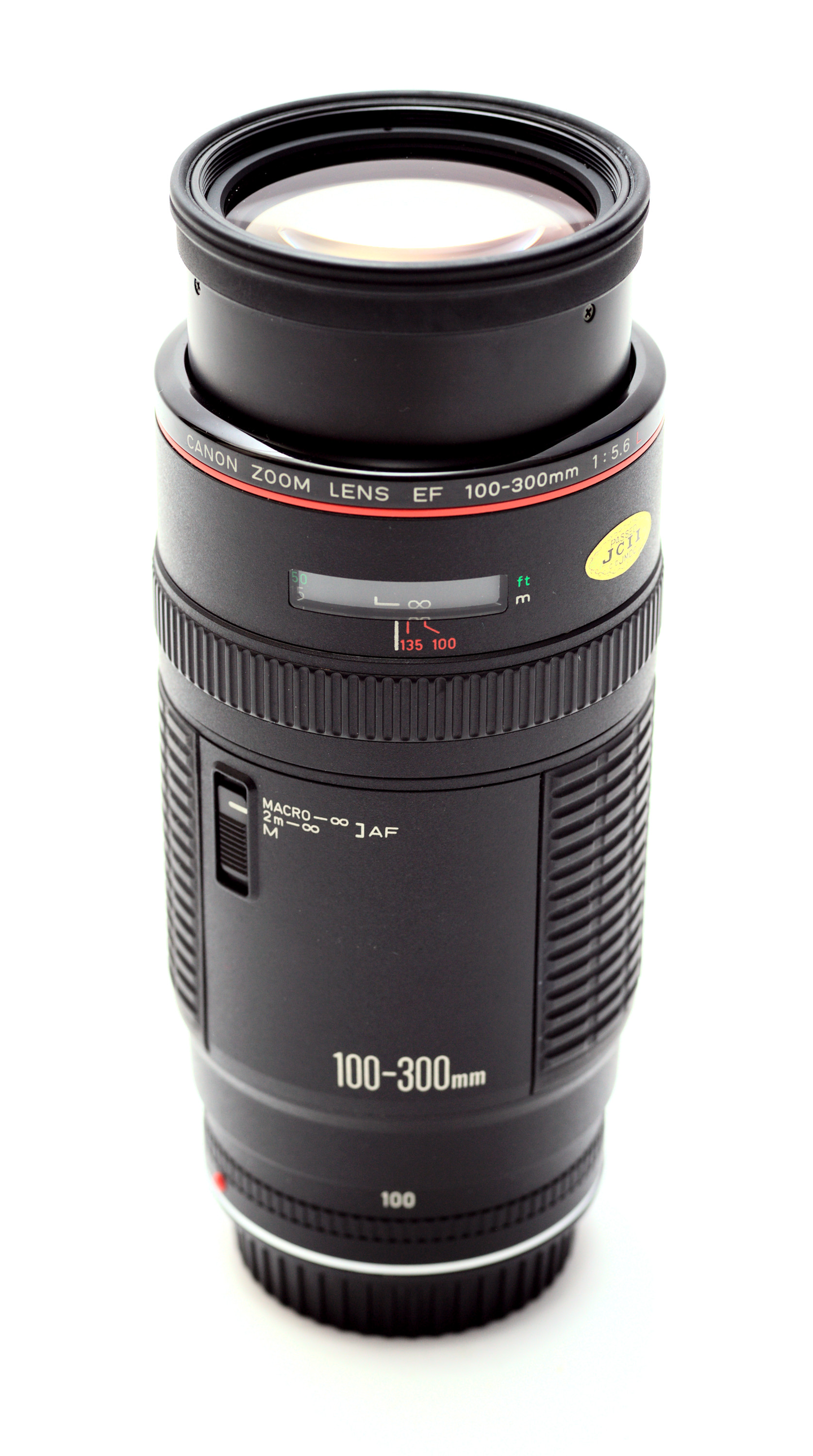
A Canon EF 100-300mm f/5.6L zoom lens

The EF 100–300mm refers to three telephoto zoom lenses produced by Canon. They are of the EF lens mount that is compatible with the EOS line of cameras.

The three versions are:

- f/5.6
- f/5.6L
- f/4.5–5.6 USM

The two 5.6 versions were contemporaries, launched at the beginning of the Canon EOS system. The L version had a different optical construction which improved sharpness, color, and chromatic aberrations. Otherwise the lenses were physically similar. Canon decided to upgrade the non-L version in the early 1990s to the 4.5-5.6 version, not the L. It had improved styling, a ring zoom control instead of push-pull, and a larger (faster) aperture at the wider end. It also made use of a much faster and much quieter Ultrasonic ("USM") motor for autofocus control, instead of the Arc-Form Drive ("AFD") found on the 5.6 lenses. The L version never received this upgrade, and it lasted long after the 5.6 non-L had been discontinued. Following Canon practice, the L lens was sold including its lens hood and protective case.

== Lenses ==
| Attribute | f/5.6 | f/5.6L | f/4.5–5.6 USM |
|---|---|---|---|
| Image stabilizer | No No | | |
| Ring USM | No No | | Yes Yes |
| L-series | No No | Yes Yes | No No |
| Diffractive Optics | No No | | |
| Ultra-low dispersion glass element | No No | Yes Yes | No No |
| Synthetic Fluorite glass element | No No | Yes Yes | No No |
| Macro | Yes Yes | | |
| Short back focus | No No | | |
| Maximum aperture | f/5.6 | | f/4.5–5.6 |
| Minimum aperture | f/32 | | f/40 |
| Weight | 685 g | 695 g | 540 g |
| Max. Diameter x Length | 75 mm x 166.8 mm | 75 mm x 166.6 mm | 73 mm x 121.5 mm |
| Filter diameter | 58 mm | | |
| Horizontal viewing angle | 20°–6°50' | | |
| Vertical viewing angle | 14°–4°35' | | |
| Diagonal viewing angle; | 24°–8°15' | | |
| Groups/elements | 9/15 | 10/15 | 10/13 |
| # of diaphragm blades | 8 | | |
| Closest focusing distance | 2 m | 1.5 m | |
| Currently in production? | No No | | |
| Release date | March 1987 | June 1987 | June 1990 |
