= Canon EF 200mm lens =

Canon SLR EF mount prime lens

The EF 200mm USM lens is an L-series prime telephoto lens made by Canon Inc. for the EOS line of cameras. Four 200 mm primes were made: f/1.8, two f/2.8, and the most recent f/2.0.

The 200 mm f/1.8 USM lens, introduced in November 1988, is the fastest 200 mm ever produced. It is a large off-white lens with rear drop-in filter tray. Production was discontinued in 2004. It featured an unusual "focus by wire" system where the focus ring drove the motor when focusing in manual mode. This functionality was shared with other lenses of this era, the 300mm f/2.8, the 600mm f/4.0 and the 1200 mm f/5.6 USM lens from Canon and these 4 lenses shared the same focus motor. The lens was used in the SuperWASP extrasolar planet search.

The 200 mm f/2.0, introduced in April 2008, comes as a successor for the above discontinued 200 mm f/1.8. It is a large off-white lens with a rear drop-in filter tray and Image Stabilization.

The 200 mm f/2.8 lens is an inexpensive long prime. The first model, introduced in December 1991, had a built-in hood. It was discontinued in March 1996. It was superseded by the 'mark II', which is similar to first model but with standard bayonet hood, and is still in production. These lenses are Canon's second least expensive L-series lens behind the Canon EF 70-200mm f/4.0. It exceeds the Canon EF 70–200 mm lens f/2.8 I in optical quality by a slight margin, but has since been overtaken by the Canon EF 70–200 mm lens f/2.8 II. In comparison, it is significantly cheaper, lighter, and less conspicuous, but at the expense of the ability to zoom. There is no Image stabilizer. It sports a ring USM allowing full-time manual focusing. The minimum focus distance is 1.5 m (59 in). It is Canon's longest L-Series lens that is painted black.

All the aforementioned lenses are compatible with the Canon Extender EF teleconverters.

== Crop factor ==
When used with a Canon APS-C (1.6× crop) DSLR camera or APS-H (1.3× crop), the field of view of this lens is similar to a 320 mm or 260 mm on full frame camera.

== Specifications of the EF 200 mm lenses ==
Attribute	f/1.8L USM	f/2L IS USM	f/2.8L USM	f/2.8L II USM
Image				
Key features
Full-frame compatible	Yes Yes			
Image stabilizer	No No	Yes Yes	No No	
Ultrasonic Motor	Yes Yes			
L-series	Yes Yes			
Diffractive Optics	No No			
Macro	No No			
Technical data
Aperture (max-min)	f/1.8–f/22	f/2.0–f/22	f/2.8–f/22	
Construction	10 groups / 12 elements	12 groups / 17 elements	7 groups / 9 elements	
# of diaphragm blades	8			
Closest focusing distance	2.5 m (98 in)	1.9 m (75 in)	1.5 m (59 in)	
Max. magnification	0.09×	0.12×	0.16×	0.16×
Horizontal viewing angle	10°			
Diagonal viewing angle	12°			
Vertical viewing angle	7°			
Physical data
Weight	6.61 lb / 3000 g	5.55 lb / 2520 g	1.74 lb / 790 g	1.68 lb / 765 g
Maximum diameter	5.11" / 130 mm	5.03" / 128 mm	3.26" / 83 mm	3.27" / 83.2 mm
Length	8.18" / 208 mm		5.36" / 136.2 mm	
Filter diameter	48 mm (drop-in)	52 mm (drop-in)	72 mm	
Accessories
Lens hood	ET-123	ET-120B	built-in	ET-83BII
Case		LENS CASE 200		LP1222
Tripod Ring	Integrated	Integrated	Tripod Ring A (B)	Tripod Ring A (B)
Retail information
Release date	November 1988	April 2008	December 1991	March 1996
Currently in production?	No No	No No	No No	Yes Yes
MSRP $	456,000 yen	$5,699.00	99,800 yen	$749.99

== See also ==
- Canon L lens
- Canon EF lens mount
