= Breathing (lens) =

Effect in some photographic lenses

Breathing originally referred to any geometric change in field-of-view by a camera lens when changing the focus distance of that lens. Even if the angle-of-view is constant, distortion changes will cause visible breathing. More recently, the term has been used by photographers to describe changes of focal length of a lens when adjusting the focus. A lens with a constant focal length will exhibit narrowing of the angle of view at closer focus, and conversely, maintaining a constant angle of view requires a precise reduction of focal length as focus is decreased, which some, often higher-quality, lenses are designed to do. Lens breathing does not prevent one from racking focus or following focus with this lens, but it lessens the desirability of any type of focus adjustment, since it will noticeably change the composition of the shot.
