= Canon Ōita Factory =

Factory in Ōita, Japan

- Built: 1982
- Location: 710 Shimohara, Ōita 873 0292, Japan; Ōita, Japan
- Coordinates: 33°28′19.59″N 131°43′33.78″E
- Industry: Optical/photographic
- Products: Compact cameras, Digital cameras, Video camcorders & Visual communication cameras
- Employees: 3,500 (2006)
- Area: 126,000 m^{2} (1,360,000 sq ft)

The Canon Ōita Factory in Ōita, Japan, is Canon's main digital imaging product plant and manufactures products such as the PowerShot, IXUS compacts, DSLR cameras, and camcorders. The plant manufactured up to 6.8 million products in 2005.

Since 1999, the factory has moved away from assembly line production to cell based production with teams of up to 20 workers. Each cell can assemble 500 camcorders in an eight-hour shift.

Canon invested 27.6 billion yen to expand the factory in two stages between 2004 and 2005.
