= Canon EF 80-200mm lens =

Canon SLR EF-mount zoom lens

The EF 80–200mm lens is a discontinued telephoto zoom lens made by Canon. The lens has an EF lens mount that fits the EOS line of cameras.

== Versions ==
There are four versions:

- f/2.8L lens (informally known as the "Magic Drainpipe")
- f/4.5–5.6 lens
- f/4.5–5.6 USM
- f/4.5–5.6 II

Canon released the f/2.8L version in September 1989, retailing it for about US$1,320. Canon replaced it with the 70–200mm f/2.8L in 1995.

== Table ==
Attribute	f/2.8L	f/4.5–5.6	f/4.5–5.6 USM	f/4.5–5.6 II
Image				
Key features
Image stabilizer	No No			
Environmental Sealing	No No			
USM	No No		Yes Yes	No No
L-series	Yes Yes	No No		
Diffractive Optics	No No			
Technical data
Maximum aperture (Min F Stop)	f/2.8	f/4.5–5.6		
Minimum aperture (Max F Stop)	f/32	f/29	f/22–27	f/29
Filter diameter	72 mm	52 mm		
Horizontal viewing angle				
Vertical viewing angle				
Diagonal viewing angle	30°–12°			
Physical data
Weight	1,330 g	275 g	260 g	250 g
Max. Diameter x Length	84 mm x 185.7 mm	71.2 mm x 77.8 mm	69 mm x 78.5 mm	
Groups/elements	13/16	7/10		
# of diaphragm blades	8	5		
Closest focusing distance	1.8 m	1.5 m		
Retail information
Release date	September 1989	November 1990	June 1992	March 1995
MSRP Yen	160,200	32,800	34,000	(sold overseas)
