= Canon EF 600mm lens =

Canon SLR EF-mount super-telephoto prime lens

The Canon EF 600mm is a super-telephoto lens made by Canon Inc. The lens has an EF mount to work with the EOS line of cameras.

- f/4L USM lens was released in November 1988 (923,000 yen).
- f/4L IS USM lens was released in September 1999 (1,290,000 yen).
- f/4L IS II USM lens was announced in February 2011 (US$12,999 at release, now US$11,499).
- f/4L IS III USM lens was announced in September 2018 (US$12,999).

The IS version has more lens groups and elements, and the weight was reduced from 6 kg (13 lb) to 5.36 kg (11.8 lb) for the first IS version. The weight was further reduced to 3.92 kg (8.6 lb) for the 2nd IS version. The weight has been further reduced to 3.05 kg (6.7 lb) for the 3rd IS version. All lenses are compatible with the Canon Extender EF teleconverters.

== Specifications ==
| Attribute | f/4L USM | f/4L IS USM | f/4L IS II USM | f/4L IS III USM |
|---|---|---|---|---|
| Image | | | | |
Key features
| Full-frame compatible | Yes Yes | | | |
| Image stabilizer | No No | Yes Yes | | |
| Environmental sealing | Yes Yes | | | |
| Ultrasonic Motor | Yes Yes | | | |
| Stepping Motor | No No | | | |
| L-series | Yes Yes | | | |
| Diffractive Optics | No No | | | |
| Macro | No No | | | |
Technical data
| Focal length | 600 mm | | | |
| Aperture (max/min) | f/4 / f/32 | | | |
| Front element aperture diameter | approx. 150mm | | | |
| Construction | 9 elements / 8 groups | 17 elements / 13 groups | 16 elements / 12 groups | 17 elements / 13 groups |
| Aspherical elements | | | 4 | Yes |
| Low dispersion elements | ??? | 1x Fluorite + 2x UD lens | 2x Fluorite | 2x Fluorite + 1x Super UD lens |
| # of diaphragm blades | 8 | | 9 (circular aperture) | |
| Closest focusing distance | 6 m (17.95 ft) | 5.5 m (16.45 ft) | 4.5 m (14.8 ft) | 4.2 m (13.78 ft) |
| Max. magnification | 0.11× | 0.12× | 0.15× | |
| Horizontal viewing angle | 3°30' | | | |
| Vertical viewing angle | 2°20' | | | |
| Diagonal viewing angle | 4°10' | | | |
Physical data
| Weight | 6000 g (212.4 oz) | 5360 g (189.8 oz) | 3920 g (138.8 oz) | 3050 g (107.6 oz) |
| Maximum diameter | 167 mm (6.6") | 168 mm (6.6") | | |
| Length | 456 mm (17.9") | | 448 mm (17.6") | |
| Filter diameter | 48 mm (rear) | Any 52(WII)-series drop-in filter | | |
Accessories
| Lens case | ? | 600 | 600B | 600C |
| Lens hood | ET-161 | ET-160 | ET-160 (WII) | ET-160 (WIII) or ET-160B |
| Lens cap | E-180II | E-185 | E-185B | E-185C |
Retail information
| Release date | November 1988 | September 1999 | June 2011 | December 2018 |
| Currently in production? | No No | | | Yes |
| MSRP US$ | 923,000 yen | 1,290,000 yen (w/case and hood) | $11,499.00 | $12,999.00 |

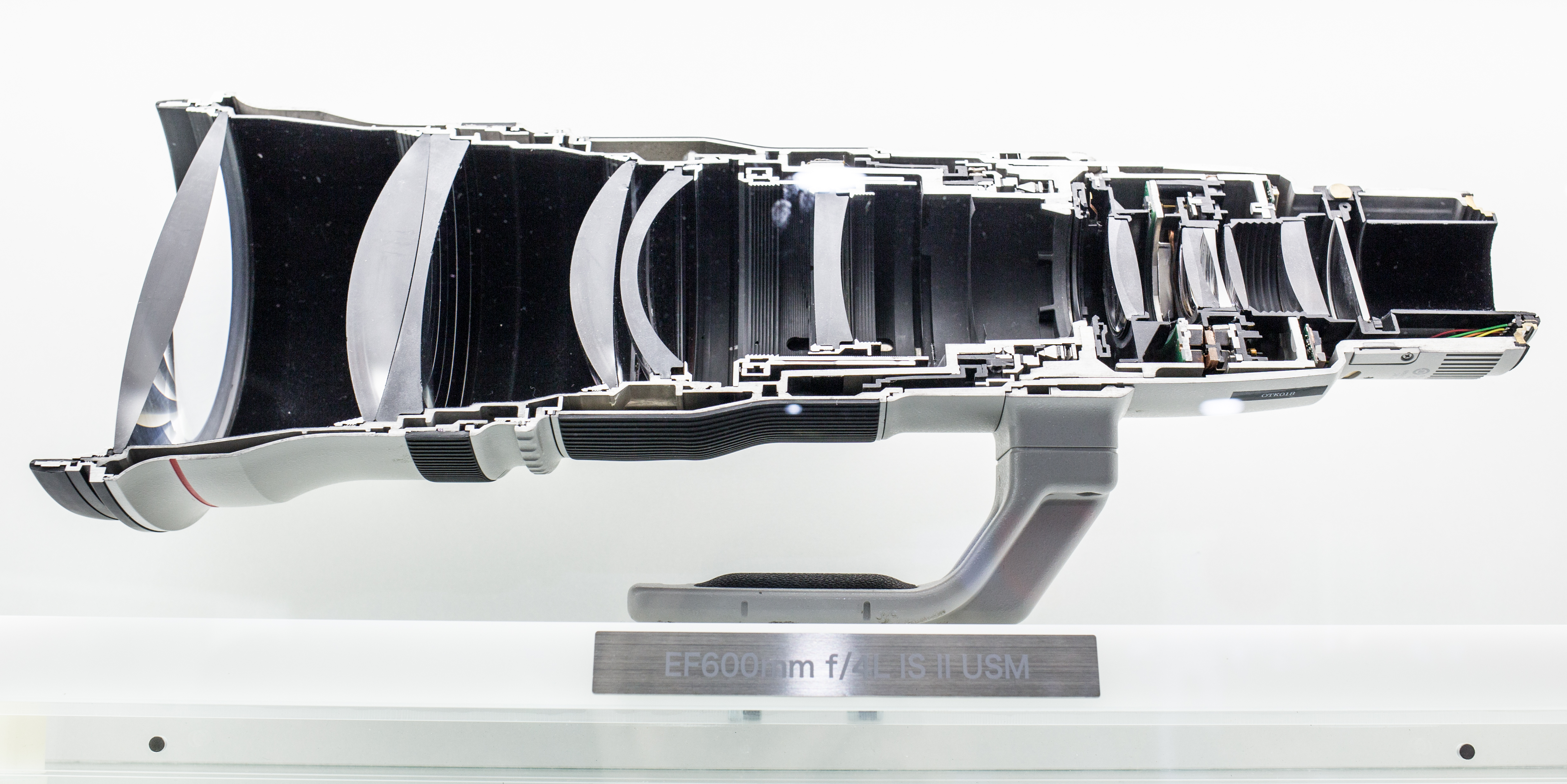
Cross section of Canon EF 600mm f/4L IS II USM lens
