= Canon EF 28-300mm lens =

35 mm camera lens

EF 28–300mm f/3.5–5.6L IS USM
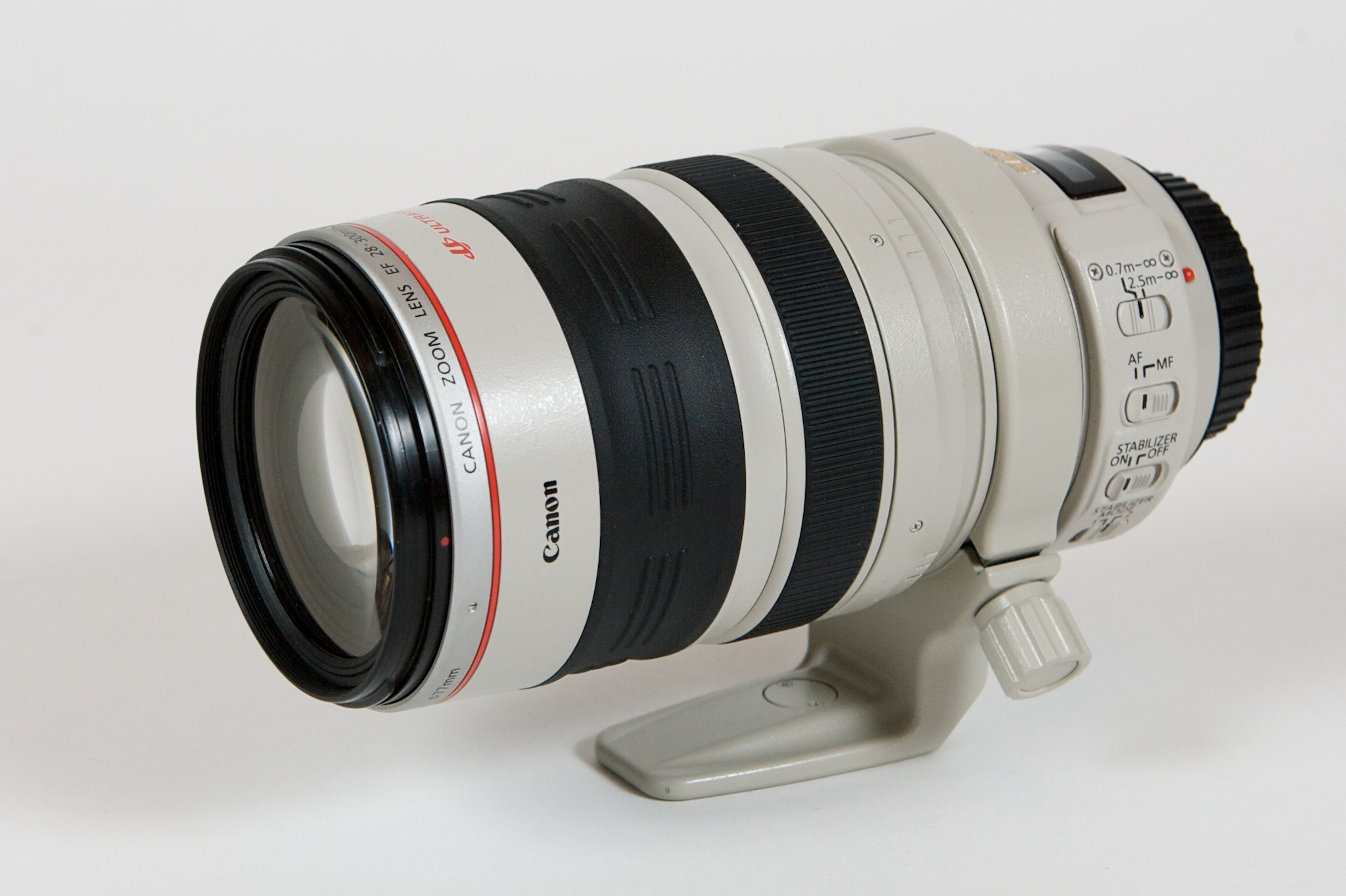
- Lens at 28mm with tripod mount.
- Maker: Canon

Technical data
- Type: Zoom
- Focus drive: Ultrasonic motor
- Focal length: 28–300mm
- Crop factor: 1.0
- Aperture (max/min): f/3.5-5.6 / f/22-40
- Close focus distance: 0.7 m / 2.3 ft
- Max. magnification: 0.3
- Diaphragm blades: 8
- Construction: 23 elements in 16 groups

Features
- Lens-based stabilization: Yes Yes
- Unique features: L-Series
- Application: Superzoom

Physical
- Max. length: 184 mm / 7.2 in
- Diameter: 92 mm / 3.6 in
- Weight: 1.67 kg / 3.7 lbs
- Filter diameter: 77 mm

Accessories
- Lens hood: EW-83G
- Case: LZ1324

Angle of view
- Horizontal: 65°–6°50'
- Vertical: 46°–4°35'
- Diagonal: 75°–8°15'

History
- Introduction: June 2004

Retail info
- MSRP: 2,500 USD

The EF 28–300mm f/3.5–5.6L IS USM lens is a superzoom lens made by Canon Inc.

The lens has an EF-type mount, which fits the Canon EOS line of cameras.

When used on a digital EOS body with a field of view compensation factor of 1.3x, such as the Canon EOS-1D Mark III, it provides a narrow field of view, equivalent to a 36–390mm lens mounted on a 35mm frame body. With a 1.6x body such as the Canon EOS 400D, it provides a narrower field of view, equivalent to a 45–480mm lens mounted on a 35mm frame body.

This lens has a push-pull type zoom mechanism and can be used for many types of photography, because of its large focal length range. It is used mostly for press photography, and also for travel photography.

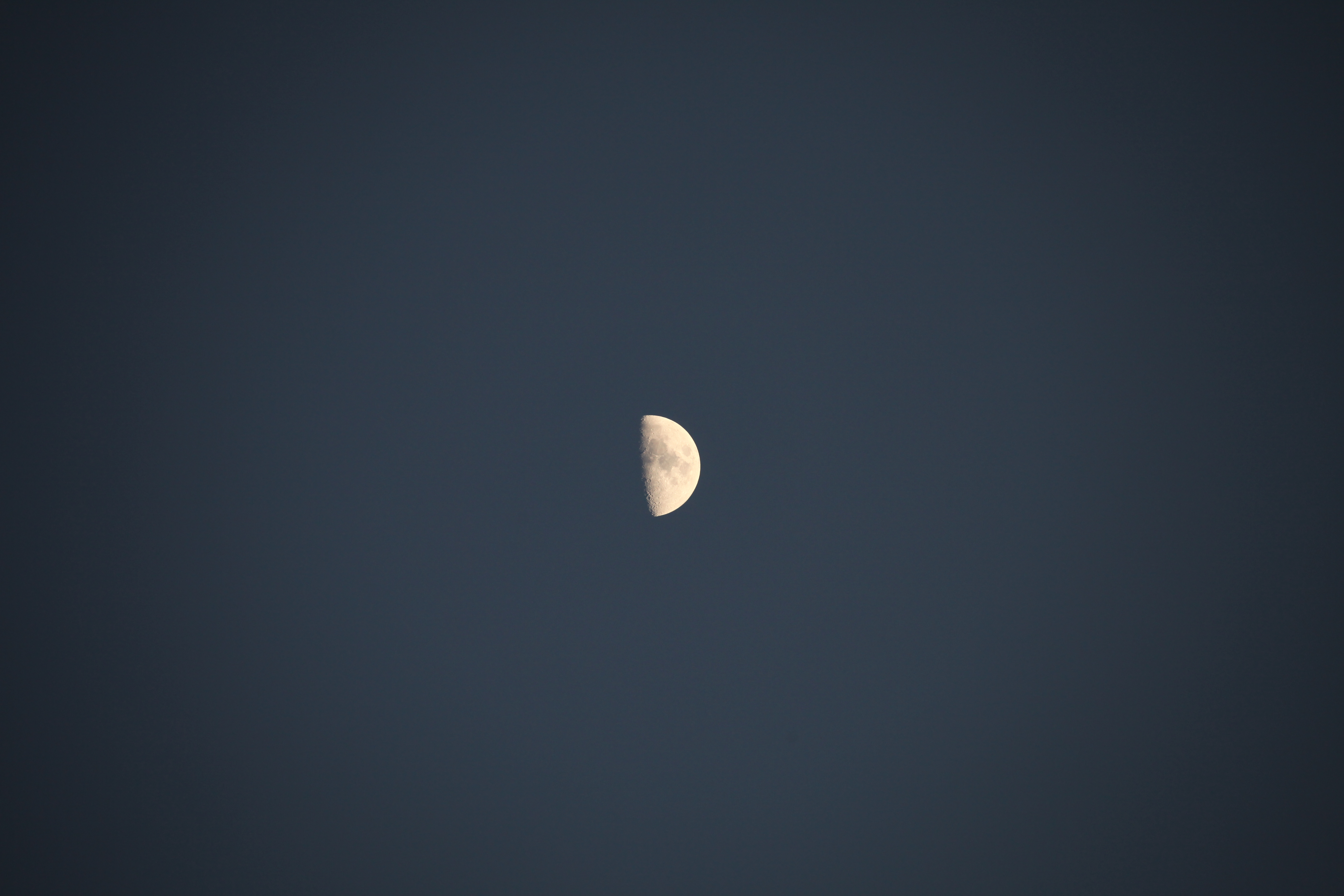
The moon taken with this lens (click for original size)

== See also ==
- Canon EOS
- Canon EF lens mount
- Canon L lens
