= Canon EF 50mm lens =

Family of camera lens

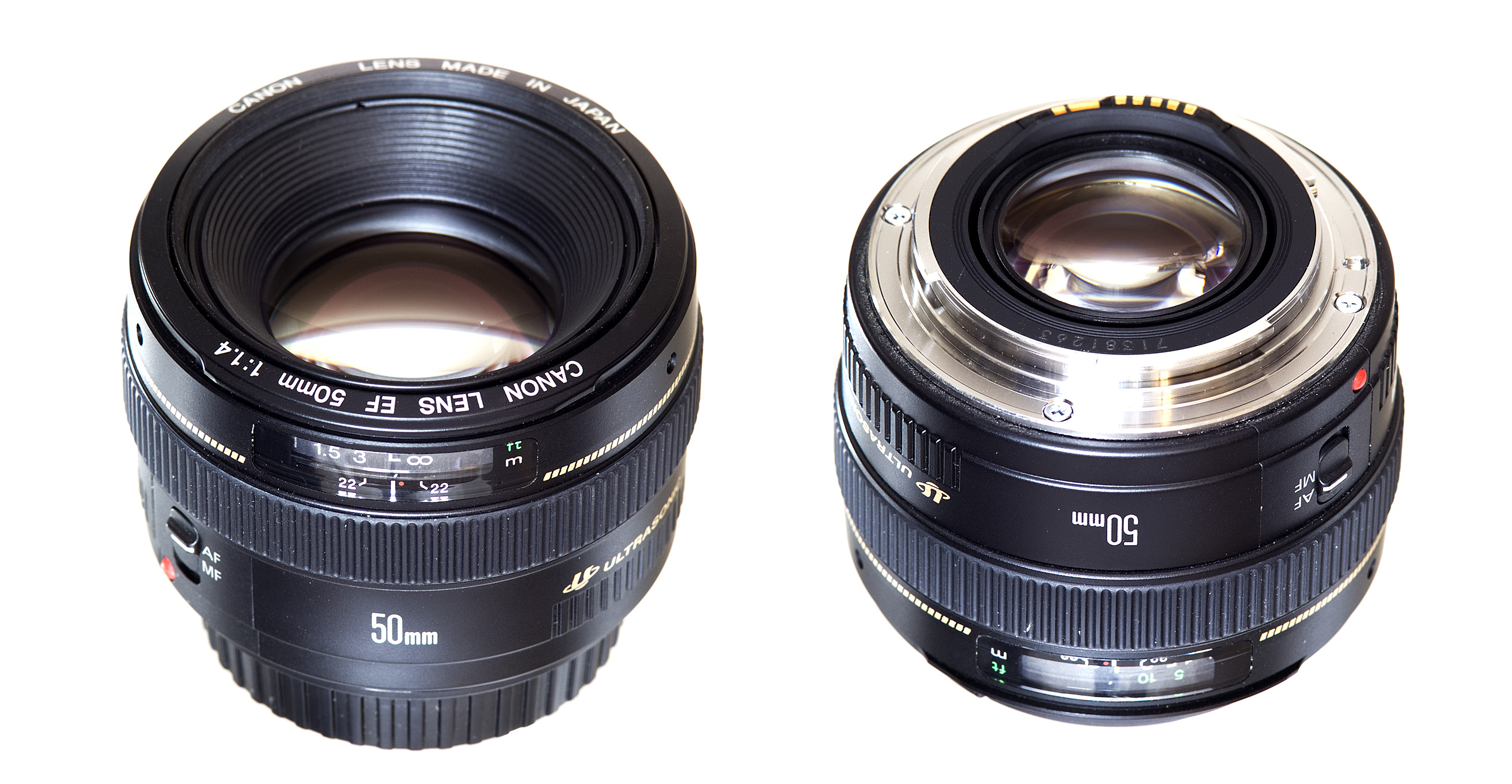
Front and rear views of a Canon EF50mm f/1.4 USM

The EF 50mm lenses are a group of normal prime lenses made by Canon that share the same focal length. These lenses are based on the classic double-Gauss lens, with the f/1.8 being a standard six-element double-Gauss with an air gap and powers between element 2 and 3 and its faster cousins adding additional elements. The 50mm focal length, when used with a 35mm film or full-frame sensor, has been widely considered to match the perspective seen by the human eye.

Canon 50mm lenses have an EF type mount that fits the Canon EOS line of cameras. When pairing a 50mm lens to a Canon DSLR with an APS-C sized sensor, the crop factor effectively turns the 50mm focal length into an 80mm field of view.

Seven EF 50mm lenses have been sold by Canon:

- f/1.0L USM (discontinued, replaced by f/1.2L USM)
- f/1.2L USM
- f/1.4 USM
- f/1.8 (discontinued, replaced by f/1.8 II)
- f/1.8 II (discontinued, replaced by f/1.8 STM)
- f/1.8 STM
- f/2.5 Compact Macro

== EF50mm f/1.0L USM ==
The discontinued EF50mm f/1.0L USM is a professional L series autofocus lens. On the used market sells for as much as double the original retail value. It was the fastest SLR lens in production during its lifetime. This lens has a metal body and mount, and plastic extremities. It also features a wide rubber focus ring that is damped, a distance window with infrared index, and the ability to set the focus range from 0.6m to infinity, or 1m to infinity. In common with the EF 85mm f/1.2L USM it uses an electronic "focus by wire" system and requires power from the camera in order to manual focus. The 8-blade diaphragm and maximum aperture of f/1.0 give this lens the ability to create extremely shallow depth of field effects and to support low light situations. The optical construction of this lens contains 11 lens elements, including two ground and polished aspherical lens elements. This lens uses a floating front extension focusing system, powered by a ring-type USM motor. The front of the lens does not rotate, but does extend when focusing.

Despite its price and large maximum aperture, the 1.0L was not a particularly sharp lens at any aperture, and the two cheaper 50mm options offered far better sharpness when stopped down beyond about f/2.8. This, combined with the high production cost and low sales volume, led to it being discontinued in 2000 and eventually superseded by the f/1.2 edition.

== EF50mm f/1.2L USM ==
The EF50mm f/1.2L USM is a professional L series lens designed to replace the EF50mm f/1.0L USM. It is constructed with a metal body and mount, and plastic extremities. This lens features a wide rubber focusing ring that is damped, a distance window with infrared index, and is fully weather-sealed, when a filter is added to the front. A circular, 8-blade diaphragm and maximum aperture of f/1.2 give this lens the ability to create very shallow depth of field effects with smooth background blur. The optical construction of this lens contains 8 lens elements, including one ground and polished aspherical lens element. This lens uses a floating front extension focusing system, powered by a ring-type USM motor. The front of the lens does not rotate or extend when focusing.

== EF50mm f/1.4 USM ==
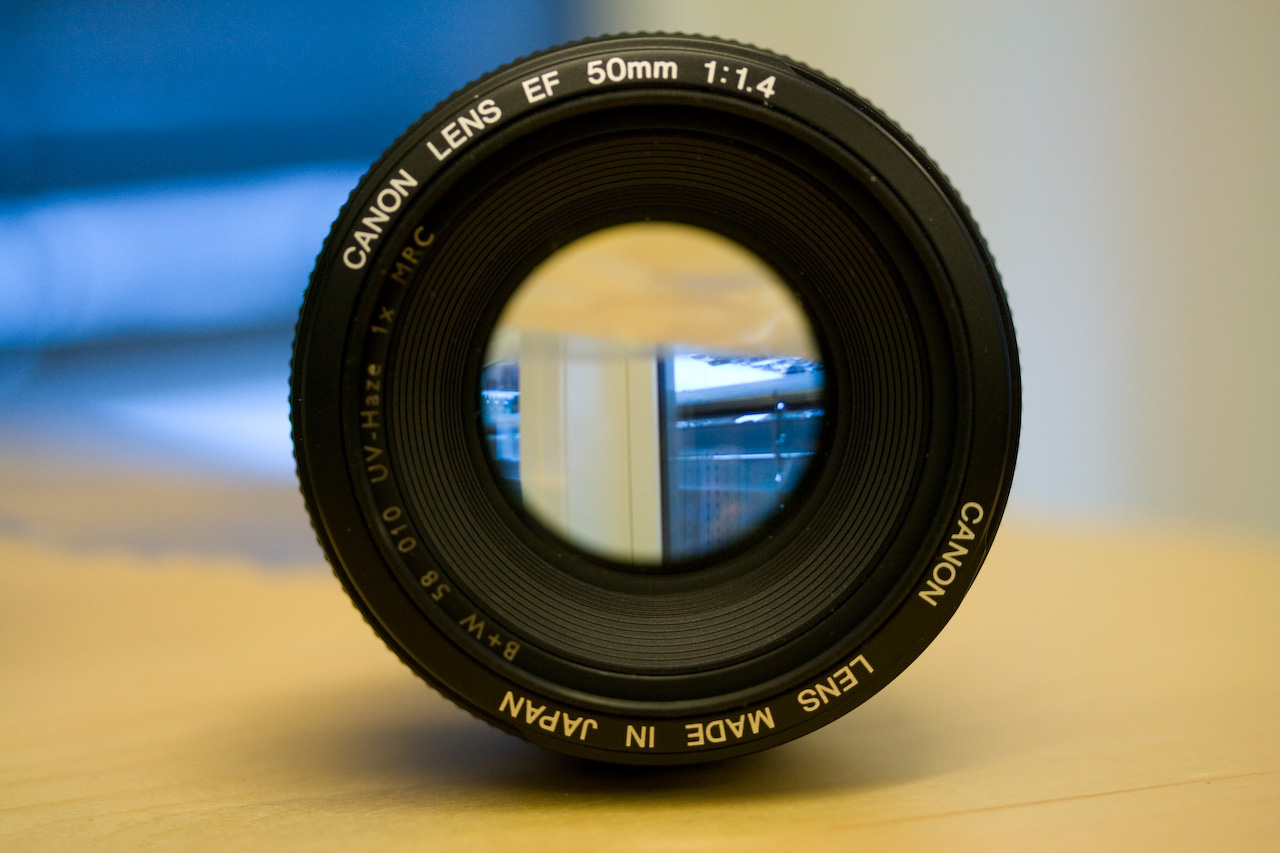
EF50mm f/1.4 USM, showing its large maximum aperture; at f/1.4 and 50 mm, the entrance pupil diameter is 35.7 mm.

The EF50mm f/1.4 USM is a consumer- and professional-level lens. It is the least expensive f/1.4 aperture lens that Canon currently manufactures. It is constructed with a plastic body and a metal mount. This lens features a distance window with infrared index. An 8-blade diaphragm and maximum aperture of f/1.4 give this lens the ability to create shallow depth of field effects. The optical construction of this lens contains 7 lens elements including 2 high refraction elements, but no aspherical, high dispersion or calcium fluoride elements. The lens uses a front extension focusing system, powered by a micro USM motor. Even though this lens uses a micro USM motor, it still has FTM (full-time manual focus) available. Auto-focus speed of this lens is fast, but not as quick as most ring-USM-based lenses. The front of the lens does not rotate, but extends by up to about one centimeter when focusing.

While similar to ring-USM lenses in terms of operation, the micro-USM motor is very prone to damage from impacts. Owners of the lens are encouraged to store the lens with the barrel fully retreated into the housing (that is, set to focus at infinity) to avoid damaging the AF motor during storage or transport. For a similar reason, use of a lens hood is recommended when the lens is mounted on a camera.

== EF50mm f/1.8 ==
The EF50mm f/1.8 is an economy level lens (discontinued in 1990), which has been replaced by the EF50mm f/1.8 II. The body is plastic while the lens mount is stainless steel, and it features a distance window with infrared index. A 5 blade maximum aperture of f/1.8 gives this lens the ability to create depth of field effects. Note that this housing and use of a 5-blade aperture were shared with the EF28mm f/2.8 and EF35mm f/2 lenses, in the case of the latter to speed date of release and keep production costs low.

The optical construction of this lens contains 6 lens elements, with no special elements. This lens uses a front extension focusing system, powered by an AFD motor. The front of the lens does not rotate when focusing, making it compatible with circular polarisers.

Although auto-focus speed, despite the AFD motor, is moderately fast but audible, the lens is still very popular.

Because of its low price (it is sold used only) and very sharp optical quality, this lens has earned the preference of a lot of photographers. When shooting at f/1.8, it offers a very shallow depth of field which is beneficial for isolating subjects against a blurred background (bokeh).

== EF50mm f/1.8 II ==
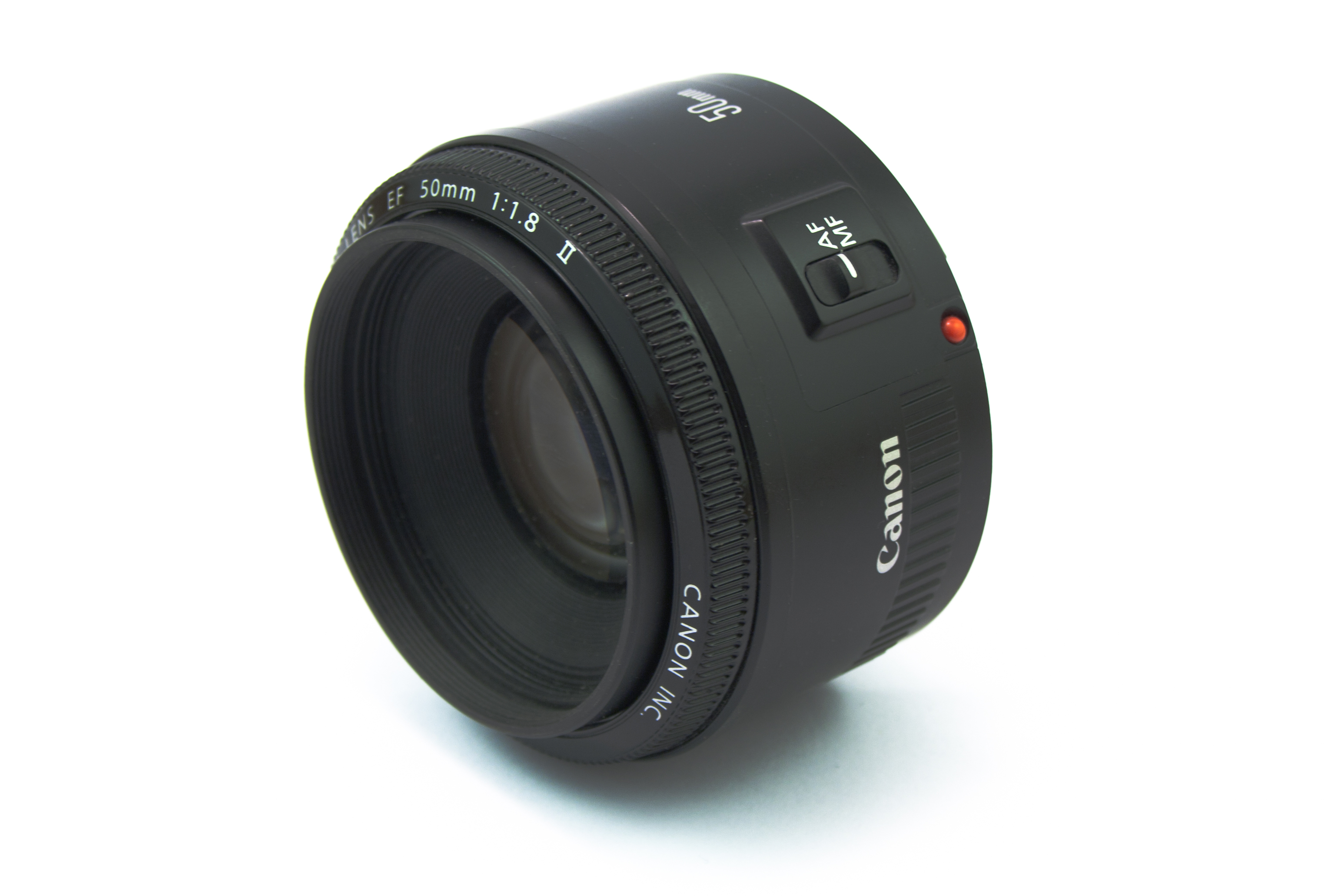
The EF50mm f/1.8 II

The EF50mm f/1.8 II replaced the EF50mm f/1.8 in 1991, until it was replaced by the EF50mm f/1.8 STM version in 2015.

The EF50mm f/1.8 II lens has a plastic lens mount, as opposed to the metal one on the original EF50mm f/1.8. The manual focusing ring from the original was replaced by a very small thin focusing ring on the front tip of the lens, and the distance scale and the IR focusing label were removed. However the lens does not suffer from a rotating front lens element and can be used with polarizing filters. The optics for both lenses are identical, with 6 elements in 5 groups and a 5 blade diaphragm, and both lenses have a 52mm filter thread.

Because of its low price and sharp optical quality, this lens earned the nicknames 'nifty fifty' and 'plastic fantastic'. When shooting at f/1.8, it offers a very shallow depth of field which is beneficial for isolating subjects against a blurred background (bokeh).

== EF50mm f/1.8 STM ==
Canon introduced the EF50mm f/1.8 STM on May 10, 2015. This lens utilizes Canon's STM (STepper Motor) focusing mechanism, which supports the Movie Servo autofocus mode. The lens features a metal mount and has a rounded seven-blade aperture. Its filter diameter of 49mm is the smallest among all lenses in the family. It shares lens elements with the EF 50mm f/1.8 II but has 7 aperture blades instead of 5 and has a closer minimum focusing distance (45 cm/ 1.5 feet on the EF 50mm f/1.8 II to 35 cm/ 1.1 feet on the STM) This lens is remarked as one of the best bang for your buck lenses because it is very sharp, very cheap, is very compact, and has a very good focusing system.

== EF50mm f/2.5 Compact Macro ==
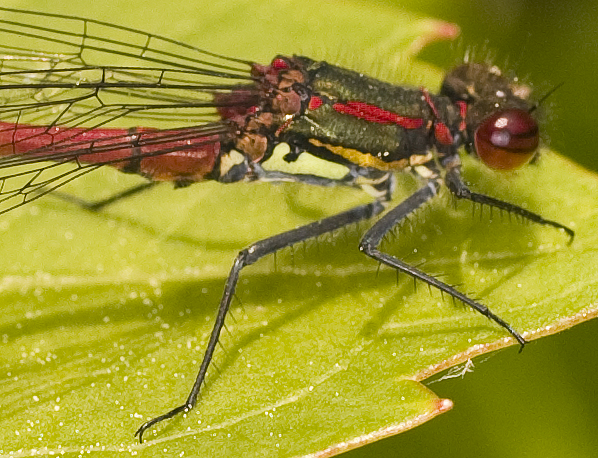
Close-up taken with 50mm Compact Macro

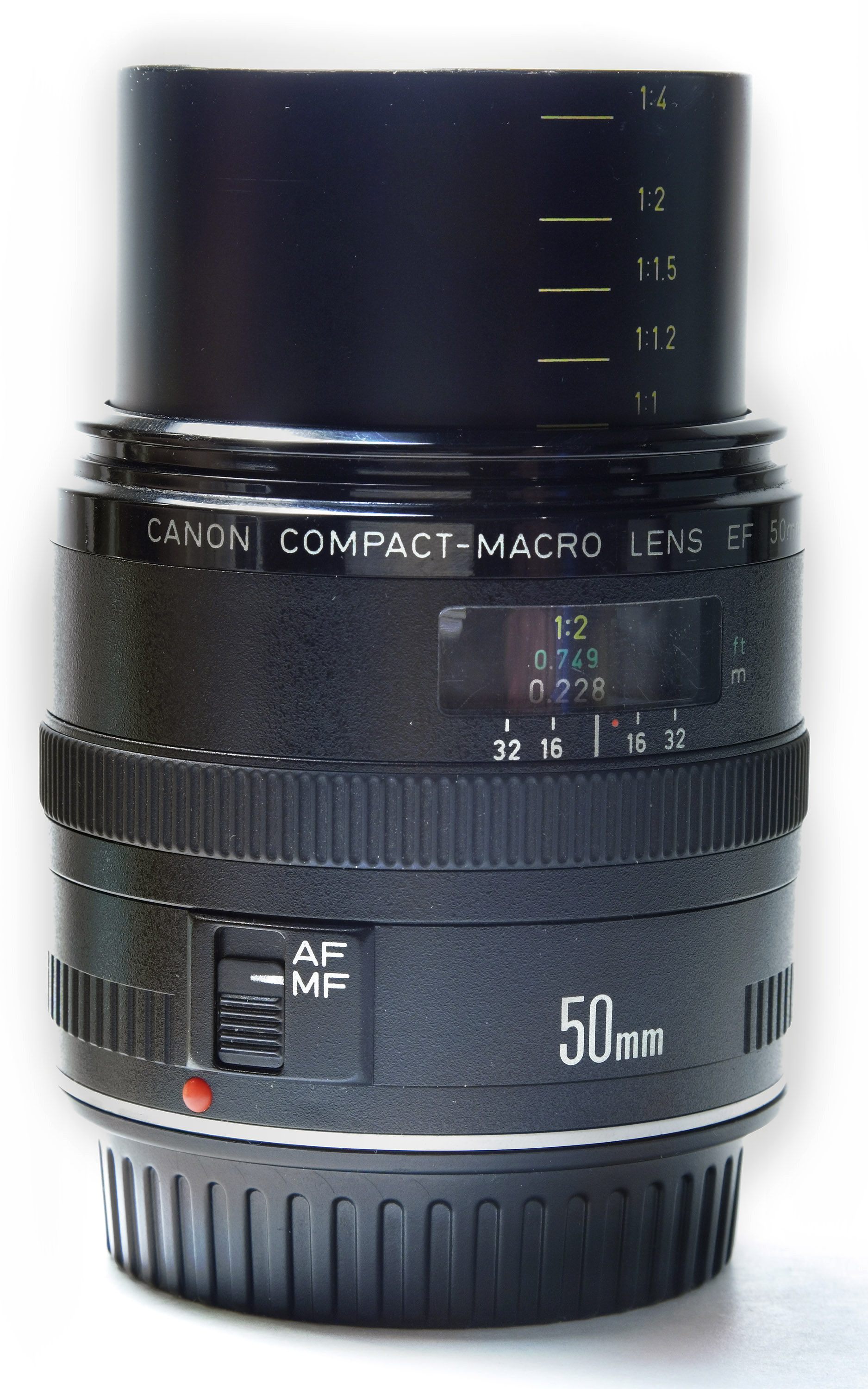
Canon EF50mm f/2.5 Compact Macro with inner lens barrel extended

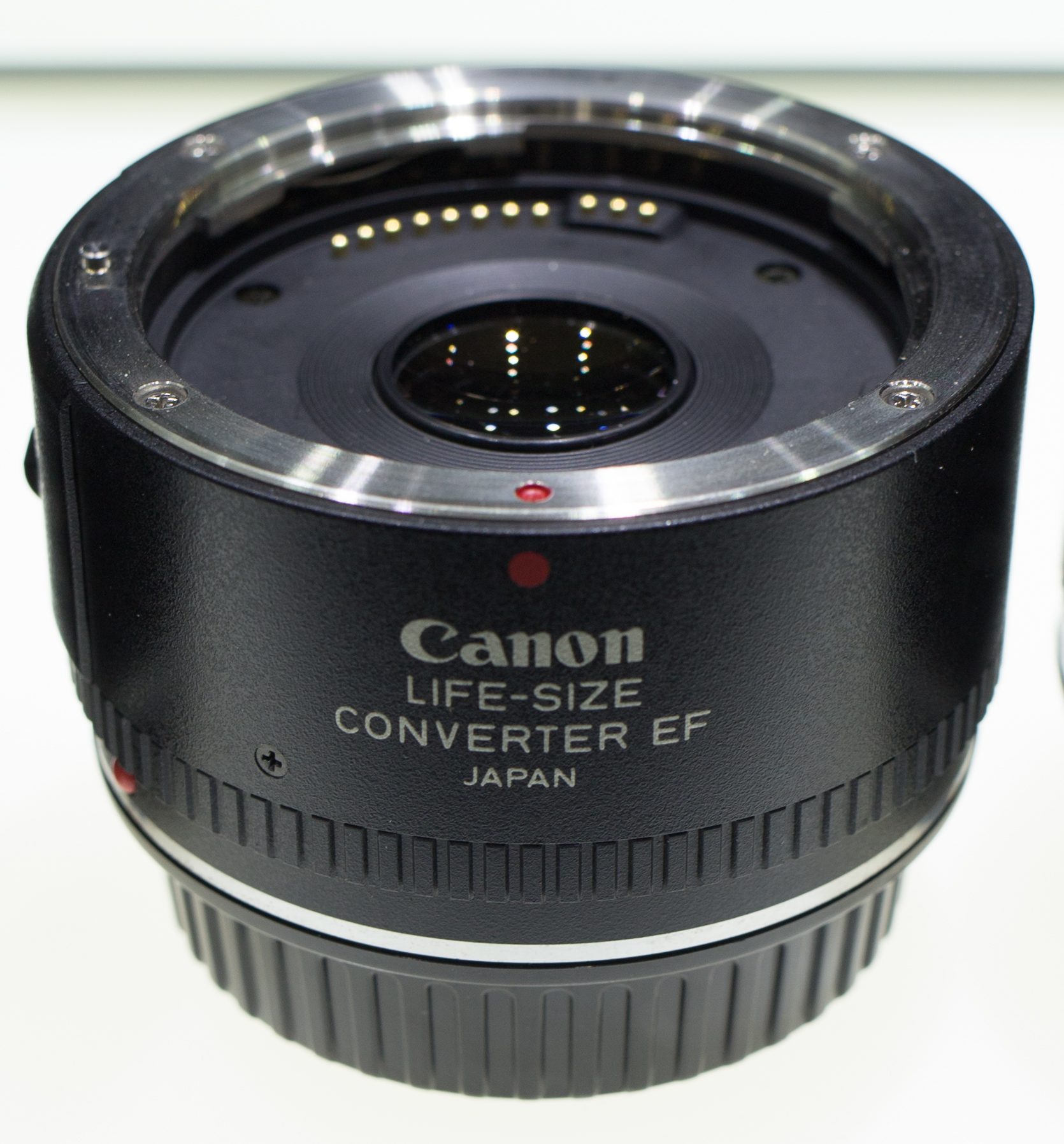
Canon LIFE-SIZE Converter for the EF50mm f/2.5 Compact Macro to get a magnification up to 1:1

The EF50mm f/2.5 Compact Macro is a relatively inexpensive macro lens with a minimum focusing distance of 23 cm (9 inches) offering a maximum magnification of 0.5× actual size. Reviewers describe the lens as having "decent"/"mid-level" build quality, with very good color and contrast, "absolutely negligible" distortion, very sharp after f/4 and peak performance at f/5.6. However, auto-focusing is relatively slow and noisy.

The maximum 0.5× magnification means this lens is more suitable for photographing documents, products and objects at least 5 cm (2 inches) wide than small insects etc. The outer barrel is grooved to accept Canon's MR-14 ring flash which can be used as the principal light source for close-ups or as on-axis fill lighting for portraits. The six-blade diaphragm provides reasonably good out-of-focus blur (bokeh) for portrait work.

First introduced in 1987, it is the oldest lens in Canon's current lineup (as of January 2014) that is still available new. The lens is constructed with a plastic body and metal mount, and features a distance window with infrared index and magnification markings. The optional Life-Size Converter EF adapts the lens to produce a maximum magnification of 1:1. Attaching the converter increases the lens focal length to 70mm, reduces the maximum aperture to f/3.5 and limits the focal range. Magnification markings for the converter are shown on the (extending) inner lens barrel.

== Specifications ==
Attribute	f/1.0L USM	f/1.2L USM	f/1.4 USM
Image			
Key features
Full-frame compatible	Yes Yes		
Image stabilizer	No No		
Ultrasonic Motor	Yes Yes		
Stepping Motor	No No		
L-series	Yes Yes		No No
Diffractive Optics	No No		
Macro	No No		
Technical data
Aperture (max-min)	f/1.0-f/16	f/1.2-f/16	f/1.4-f/22
Construction	9 groups / 11 elements	6 groups / 8 elements	6 groups / 7 elements
# of diaphragm blades	8		
Closest focusing distance	2 ft / 0.6m	1.5 ft / 0.45m	
Max. magnification	0.11x	0.15× (1:6.6)	
Horizontal viewing angle	40°		
Diagonal viewing angle	46°		
Vertical viewing angle	27°		
Physical data
Weight	2.2 lb / 985 g	1.2 lb / 545 g	0.6 lb / 290 g
Maximum diameter	3.6 in / 91.5 mm	3.6 in / 85.8 mm	2.9 in / 73.8 mm
Length	3.2 in / 81.5 mm	2.6 in / 65.5 mm	2.0 in / 50.5 mm
Filter diameter	72 mm		58 mm
Accessories
Lens hood	ES-79II	ES-78	ES-71II
Previous case	-		ES-C9
Case	LP1216	LP1214	LP1014
Retail information
Release date	September 1989	January 2007	June 1993
Currently in production?	No No	Yes Yes	
MSRP $	$4210	$1599	$520

Attribute	f/1.8	f/1.8 II	f/1.8 STM	f/2.5 Compact Macro
Image				
Key features
Full-frame compatible	Yes Yes			
Image stabilizer	No No			
Ultrasonic Motor	No No			
Stepping Motor	No No		Yes Yes	No No
L-series	No No			
Diffractive Optics	No No			
Macro	No No			Yes Yes (1:2)
Technical data
Aperture (max-min)	f/1.8-f/22			f/2.5-f/32
Construction	5 groups / 6 elements			8 groups / 9 elements
# of diaphragm blades	5		7	6
Closest focusing distance	1.5 ft / 0.45m		1.15 ft / 0.35m	0.749 ft / 0.228m
Max. magnification	0.15× (1:6.6)		0.21× (1:4.8)	0.50× (1:2)
Horizontal viewing angle	40°			
Diagonal viewing angle	46°			
Vertical viewing angle	27°			
Physical data
Weight	0.4 lb / 190 g	0.3 lb / 130 g	0.3 lb / 159 g	0.6 lb / 280 g
Maximum diameter	2.6 in / 67.4 mm	2.6 in / 68.2 mm	2.7 in / 69.2 mm	2.7 in / 67.6 mm
Length	1.7 in / 42.5 mm	1.6 in / 41 mm	1.5 in / 39.3 mm	2.5 in / 63 mm
Filter diameter	52 mm		49 mm	52 mm
Accessories
Lens hood	ES-65 or ES-65 III	ES-62AD	ES-68	n/a
Previous case	ES-C9		-	ES-C9
Case	LP1014			LP814
Retail information
Release date	March 1987	December 1990	May 2015	December 1987
Currently in production?	No No	Yes Yes		
MSRP $		$130	$125	$299
