= Canon EF 70–200mm lens =

Camera lens

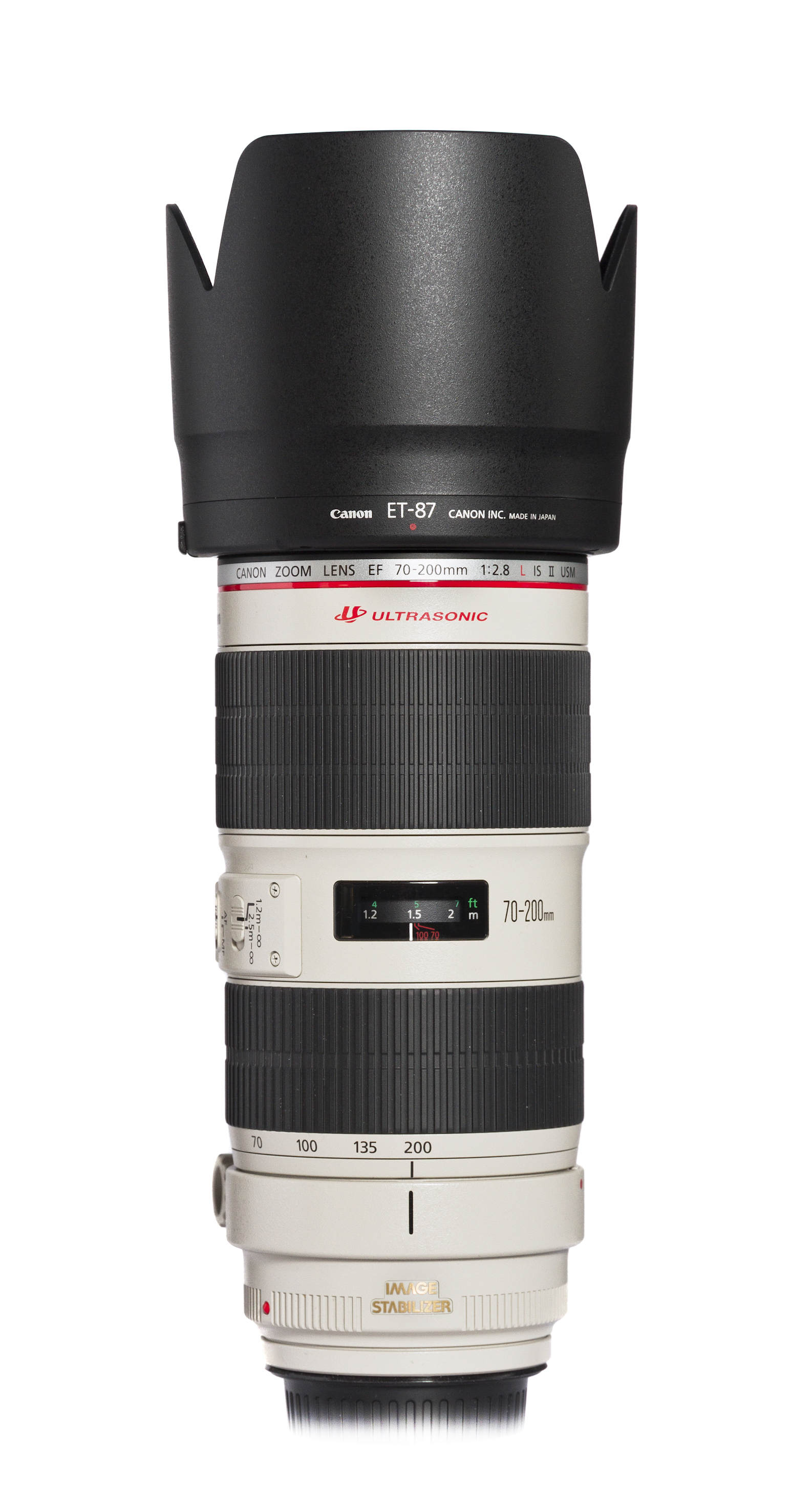
Canon EF 70–200mm f/2.8L IS II USM with lens hood

The EF 70–200mm lenses are a group of telephoto zoom full-frame lenses made by Canon. The lenses have an EF mount to work with the EOS line of cameras.

The lens comes in seven different versions, all of which have fixed maximum aperture at all focal lengths, and are L-series lenses.

- f/4L USM
- f/4L IS USM
- f/4L IS II USM
- f/2.8L USM
- f/2.8L IS USM
- f/2.8L IS II USM
- f/2.8L IS III USM

The latest iterations of both the f/4 and the f/2.8 variants were announced on 7 June 2018. The f/4 is currently under production and the original MSRP was increased from US$1,299 to US$1,499. In March 2021, it was reported that Canon had decided to discontinue the lens.

== Common fields of application ==
The f/4 USM is popular among weight-sensitive landscape photographers and hobbyists who want L lens quality without spending thousands of dollars. The f/2.8 versions are popular among event photographers and photojournalists where the lens's lower light capabilities are required. Some portrait photographers also prefer this lens because the fast aperture produces more background blur and bokeh.

The non-IS f/2.8 version was released in 1995 and replaced the EF 80–200mm f/2.8L. The lenses use nine- or eight-bladed, circular diaphragms which maintain a nearly circular aperture when stopped down. The f/2.8 and f/4.0 image-stabilized versions also feature weather sealing when mated to a weather-sealed camera to such as the Canon EOS 1D-series bodies. These lenses are compatible with the Canon Extender EF teleconverters. Due to its internal zooming mechanism, the lens does not creep or zoom when pointed downward.

== 35-mm-equivalent focal lengths on cameras with smaller sensors ==
When used with a Canon APS-C (1.6x crop) DSLR camera or APS-H (1.3x crop), the 35-mm-equivalent focal lengths of these lenses are 112–320mm on an APS-C sensor and 91–260mm on an APS-H sensor. This is due to the crop factor inherent with APS-C or APS-H (crop) sensor digital SLR cameras.

== Switches ==
A frequently pointed-out problem with this lens is the placement of the IS and AF switches, which make them prone to accidental flipping during hand-held shooting. Some photographers solve this by covering the buttons with a piece of gaffer tape. In recognition of this issue, starting with the f/4L IS USM model and f/2.8L IS II USM lens, Canon uses switches designed to reduce the incidence of accidental switch activation.

== Specifications ==
Attribute	f/2.8L IS III USM	f/2.8L IS II USM	f/2.8L IS USM	f/2.8L USM	f/4L IS II USM	f/4L IS USM	f/4L USM
Image							
Key features
Image stabilizer	Yes Yes, 3rd generation (3.5 stops)	Yes Yes, 3rd generation (3.5 stops)	Yes Yes, 2nd generation (3 stops)	No No	Yes Yes, 4th generation (5 stops)	Yes Yes, 3rd generation (4 stops)	No No
Environmental Sealing	Yes Yes			No No	Yes Yes		No No
Ultrasonic Motor	Yes Yes						
L-series	Yes Yes						
Diffractive Optics	No No						
Macro	No No						
Technical data
Maximum aperture	f/2.8				f/4.0		
Minimum aperture	f/32						
Horizontal viewing angle	29° – 10°						
Vertical viewing angle	19°30' – 7°						
Diagonal viewing angle	34° – 12°						
Groups/elements	19/23		18/23	15/18	15/20		13/16
# of diaphragm blades	8 circular aperture	8			9 circular aperture	8	
Closest focusing distance	1.2 m (3.9 ft)		1.4 m (4.6 ft)	1.5 m (4.9 ft)	1.0 m (3.3 ft)	1.2 m (3.9 ft)	
Maximum Magnification	.21×		.17×	.16×	.27×	.21×	
Physical data
Weight	1,480 g (3.26 lb)	1,490 g (3.28 lb)	1,470 g (3.24 lb)	1,310 g (2.89 lb)	780 g (1.72 lb)	760 g (1.68 lb)	705 g (1.554 lb)
Maximum diameter	89 mm (3.5 in)		86 mm (3.4 in)	85 mm (3.3 in)	80 mm (3.1 in)	76 mm (3.0 in)	
Length	199 mm (7.8 in)	197 mm (7.8 in)	197 mm (7.8 in)	194 mm (7.6 in)	176 mm (6.9 in)	172 mm (6.8 in)	
Filter diameter	77 mm				72 mm	67 mm	
Accessories
Lens hood	Tulip-shaped (ET-87)		Tulip-shaped (ET-86)	Tulip-shaped (ET-83II)	ET-78B	Cylindrical (ET-74)	
Retail information
Release date	August 2018	April 2010	September 2001	March 1995	June 2018	November 2006	September 1999
Currently in production?	Yes Yes	No No			Yes Yes	No No	
MSRP US$	$2,099.00	$2,099.00	$1,999.00	$1,349.00	$1,499.00	$1,199.00	$649.99
