= Canon EF 24mm lens =

Canon Inc. has produced seven different 24mm lenses for its Canon EF and EF-S lens mounts. Three have been discontinued after updated replacements were announced.

- EF 24mm f/1.4L USM, introduced December 1997. (discontinued in 2008, replaced by EF 24mm f/1.4L II USM)
- EF 24mm f/1.4L II USM, introduced December 2008.
- EF 24mm f/2.8, introduced November 1988. (discontinued in 2012, replaced by EF 24 f/2.8 IS USM)
- EF 24mm f/2.8 IS USM, announced February 2012, available since June 2012.
- EF-S 24mm f/2.8 STM, announced September 2014. Unlike the other 24mm lenses, it will mount only on bodies that support the EF-S mount. It will mount on all current Canon DSLR bodies with APS-C sensors, as well as older APS-C bodies dating to the 2003 introduction of the EF-S mount (in other words, the EOS 10D and older bodies are not compatible). It will not mount on any DSLR body with a full-frame or APS-H sensor. It also cannot directly mount on Canon's mirrorless bodies (either the APS-C EF-M mount or the full-frame RF mount), but the company sells adapters that allow EF-S lenses to be used on either mirrorless mount. As it is designed for Canon APS-C bodies, its field of view is equivalent to a 38mm lens on a full-frame sensor, and operates similar to the Canon EF 40mm f/2.8 STM pancake lens. Compared to the EF 24 f/2.8 IS USM, the EF-S lens loses IS, but lists for about a fourth of the price. The STM offers advantages for video shooting over USM, specifically quieter autofocus.
- TS-E 24mm f/3.5L, introduced April 1991. (discontinued, replaced by TS-E 24mm f/3.5L II)
- TS-E 24mm f/3.5L II, introduced June 2009.

== Specifications of the EF 24mm lenses ==
Attribute	EF f/1.4L USM	EF f/1.4L II USM	EF f/2.8	EF f/2.8 IS USM	EF-S f/2.8 STM
Image					
Key features
Full-frame compatible	Yes Yes				No No
Image stabilizer	No No			Yes Yes	No No
Ultrasonic Motor	Yes Yes		No No	Yes Yes	No No
Stepping Motor	No No				Yes Yes
L-series	Yes Yes		No No		
Diffractive Optics	No No				
Macro	No No				
Technical data
Aperture (max-min)	f/1.4-f/22		f/2.8-f/22		
Construction	9 groups / 11 elements	10 groups / 13 elements	10 groups / 10 elements	9 groups / 11 elements	5 groups / 6 elements
# of diaphragm blades	7 (rounded)	8 (rounded)	6	7 (rounded)	7
Closest focusing distance	0.82' / 0.25m			0.66' / 0.20m	0.52' / 0.16m
Max. magnification	0.16x	0.17x	0.16x	0.23x	0.27x
Horizontal viewing angle	74°				50° 35′
Diagonal viewing angle	84°				59° 10′
Vertical viewing angle	53°				34° 55′
Physical data
Weight	1.21 lb / 550 g	1.43 lb / 650 g	.59 lb / 270 g	.61 lb / 280 g	4.4 oz / 125 g
Maximum diameter	3.2" / 83.5 mm		2.7" / 67.5 mm	2.69" / 68.4 mm	2.7" / 68.2 mm
Length	3.04" / 77.4 mm	3.4" / 86.9 mm	1.9" / 48.5 mm	2.19" / 55.7 mm	0.9" / 22.8 mm
Filter diameter	77 mm		58 mm		52 mm
Accessories
Lens hood	EW-83DII	EW-83K	EW-60II	EW-65B	ES-52
Case		LP1319	LP811	LP1014	LP811
Retail information
Release date	December 1997	December 2008	November 1988	June 2012	September 2014
Currently in production?	No No	Yes Yes	No No	No No	Yes Yes
MSRP $	$1700.00	$1749.00	$374.99	$599.99	$149.99
