= Canon EF 14mm lens =

Ultra wide angle lens

The Canon EF 14mm f/2.8L USM is an ultra wide angle prime lens. It is the widest prime lens in the Canon EF series. Because it is corrected for a rectilinear projection, the field of view is less than that of the Canon 15mm fisheye.

The front element of the lens is so prominent that it does not allow use of filters on the front. Filters are instead mounted on the rear.

On August 20, 2007, Canon announced the EF 14mm f/2.8L II USM lens, which was released that October. This lens dramatically improved sharpness and chromatic aberration, and is especially good at close focusing distances. It has replaced the earlier lens.

== Specifications ==
| Attribute | f/2.8L USM | f/2.8L II USM |
|---|---|---|
| Image | | |
Key features
| Full-frame compatible | Yes Yes | |
| Image stabilizer | No No | |
| Ultrasonic Motor | Yes Yes | |
| Stepping Motor | No No | |
| L-series | Yes Yes | |
| Macro | No No | |
Technical data
| Focal length | 14 mm | |
| Aperture (max/min) | f/2.8 / f/22 | |
| Construction | 13 elements / 10 groups | 14 elements / 11 groups |
| # of diaphragm blades | 5 | 6 (circular aperture) |
| Closest focusing distance | 0.25 m (10.0 ") | 0.20 m (7.9 ") |
| Max. magnification | 0.1 x | |
| Horizontal viewing angle | 104 ° | |
| Vertical viewing angle | 81 ° | |
| Diagonal viewing angle | 114 ° | |
Physical data
| Weight | 560 g (19.8 oz) | 645 g (22.8 oz) |
| Maximum diameter | 77 mm (3.0 ") | 80 mm (3.2 ") |
| Length | 89 mm (3.5 ") | 94 mm (3.7 ") |
| Filter diameter | Gel filter holder at rear of lens | |
Accessories
| Lens case | LP1016 | |
| Lens hood | Built-in | |
Retail information
| Release date | December 1991 | September 2007 |
| Currently in production? | No No | Yes Yes |
| MSRP US$ | 298,000 yen | 307,000 yen / $2,885.41 |
