= Canon EF 35-135mm lens =

Canon SLR EF-mount zoom lens

The Canon EF 35-135mm f/3.5-4.5 is an EF mount wide-to-normal zoom lens which was introduced in 1988.

In 1990 Canon announced the EF 35-135mm f/4-5.6 USM lens, featuring a different optical and physical design, and a ring USM AF motor. The new lens replaced the original and was billed as an ideal compact travel lens.

== Specifications ==
Attribute	f/3.5-4.5	f/4-5.6 USM
Image		
Key features
Full-frame compatible	Yes Yes	
Image stabilizer	No No	
Ultrasonic Motor	No No	Yes Yes
Stepping Motor	No No	
L-series	No No	
Macro	No No	
Technical data
Focal length	35 mm–135 mm	
Aperture (max/min)	f/3.5–f/4.5 / f/29	f/4–f/5.6 / f/32
Construction	16 elements / 12 groups	14 elements / 12 groups
# of diaphragm blades	6	5
Closest focusing distance	0.95 m (3.1 ft)	0.75 m (2.5 ft)
Max. magnification	0.18 x	0.15 x
Horizontal viewing angle		
Vertical viewing angle		
Diagonal viewing angle		
Physical data
Weight	475 g (16.8 oz)	425 g (15.0 oz)
Maximum diameter	73.4 mm (2.89 in)	72 mm (2.8 in)
Length	94.5 mm (3.72 in)	86.4 mm (3.40 in)
Filter diameter	58 mm	
Accessories
Lens case	LH-1315	LH-C13
Lens hood	EW-68B	EW-62
Retail information
Release date	June 1988	March 1990
Currently in production?	No No	
MSRP yen	71,200	50,000
