= Canon EF 35–105mm lens =

Canon SLR EF mount zoom lens

The EF 35-105mm lens is a family of EF mount wide-to-normal zoom lenses manufactured and sold by Canon. There were three versions made. The first version was released in 1987 as an f/3.5 - f/4.5 aperture lens. The next was released in 1991 as a f/4.5 - f/5.6 aperture lens. The last version was released in 1992 as a f/4.5 - f/5.6 USM version.

On several recent high-end Canon EOS bodies, including the EOS 7D Mark II, EOS 5D Mark III and EOS-1D X, the f/4.5–5.6 versions of this lens are treated for the purpose of autofocus as if they were f/8 lenses, limiting AF functionality to the center point (and surrounding four points if AF Point Expansion is enabled) only. They are the only lenses without an extender attached that are treated this way.

== Specifications ==
Attribute	f/3.5–4.5	f/4.5–5.6	f/4.5–5.6 USM
Image			
Key features
Full-frame compatible	Yes Yes		
Image stabilizer	No No		
Environmental Sealing	No No		
Ultrasonic Motor	No No		Yes Yes
L-series	No No		
Diffractive Optics	No No		
Technical data
Aperture (max–min)	f/3.5–4.5 – f/29	f/4.5–5.6 – f/29	
Construction	11 groups / 14 elements	12 groups / 13 elements	
# of diaphragm blades	5		
Closest focusing distance	0.85 m (2.8 ft)		
Max. magnification	0.16x		
Horizontal viewing angle			
Diagonal viewing angle			
Vertical viewing angle			
Physical data
Weight	400 g (0.88 lb)	280 g (0.62 lb)	
Maximum diameter	73.2 mm (2.88 in)	70.6 mm (2.78 in)	68 mm (2.7 in)
Length	81.9 mm (3.22 in)	63.3 mm (2.49 in)	63 mm (2.5 in)
Filter diameter	58 mm		
Accessories
Lens hood	EW 68B	?	?
Retail information
Release date	March 1987	April 1991	June 1992
Currently in production?	No No		
MSRP yen	44,700	32,000	36,000
