= Canon EF 38-76mm lens =

Canon SLR EF-mount zoom lens

The Canon EF 38–76mm f/4.5–5.6 is an EF mount wide-to-normal zoom lens.

== Specifications ==
Attribute	f/4.5–5.6
Image	
Key features
Image stabilizer	No
Environmental Sealing	No
Ultrasonic Motor	No
L-series	No
Diffractive Optics	No
Macro	No
Technical data
Maximum aperture	f/4.5–f/5.6
Minimum aperture	f/27
Horizontal viewing angle	
Vertical viewing angle	
Diagonal viewing angle	31.8°–59.3°
Groups/elements	6/6
# of diaphragm blades	5
Closest focusing distance	0.58 m (1.9 ft)
Maximum Magnification	0.15×
Physical data
Weight	155 g (5.5 oz)
Maximum diameter	65 mm (2.6 in)
Length	63.8 mm (2.51 in)
Filter diameter	52 mm
Accessories
Lens hood	ET-54
Lens Cap	E-52 (E-52 II)
Case	
Retail information
Release date	February 1995
MSRP (US$)	
