= Canon EF 55–200mm lens =

Telephoto zoom lenses produced by Canon

The EF55-200mm refers to two telephoto zoom lenses produced by Canon. They are of the EF lens mount that is compatible with the EOS line of cameras.

The two versions are:

- f/4.5-5.6
- f/4.5-5.6 II

== Lenses ==
| Attribute | f/4.5-5.6 | f/4.5-5.6 II |
|---|---|---|
| Image stabilizer | No | |
| Ring USM | Yes | |
| L-series | No | |
| Diffractive Optics | No | |
| Ultra-low dispersion glass element | No | |
| Synthetic Fluorite glass element | No | |
| Macro | No | |
| Short back focus | No | |
| Maximum aperture | f/4.5-5.6 | |
| Minimum aperture | f/22-27 | f/22-27 (1/3-stop increments is 22-29) |
| Weight | 310 grams (0.68 lb) | |
| Max. Diameter x Length | 70 millimetres (2.8 in) x 97 millimetres (3.8 in) | |
| Filter diameter | 52 mm | |
| Groups/elements | 13/13 | |
| # of diaphragm blades | 6 | |
| Closest focusing distance | 1.20 metres (3.9 ft) | |
| Currently in production? | No | |
| Release date | March 1998 | September 2003 |
