= Canon EF 35-70mm lens =

Canon SLR EF mount zoom lens

The Canon EF 35-70mm f/3.5-4.5 is an EF mount wide-to-normal zoom lens. It is one of the first lenses in the Canon EF series. It has the same zoom system and 9 lenses in 8 groups layout as the Canon New FD 35-70mm f/3.5-4.5 although it is unclear whether the actual optical design is identical.

In October 1988, Canon announced the EF 35-70mm f/3.5-4.5A lens. This lens has similar physical values, but lacks the manual focus ring. It was sold at a lower price.

== Specifications ==
| Attribute | f/3.5-4.5 | f/3.5-4.5A |
|---|---|---|
| Image | | |
Key features
| Full-frame compatible | Yes Yes | |
| Image stabilizer | No No | |
| Ultrasonic Motor | No No | |
| Stepping Motor | No No | |
| L-series | No No | |
| Macro | No No | |
Technical data
| Focal length | 35 mm–70 mm | |
| Aperture (max/min) | f/3.5–f/4.5 / f/29 | |
| Construction | 9 elements / 8 groups | |
| # of diaphragm blades | 5 | |
| Closest focusing distance | 0.39 m (1.3 ft) | |
| Max. magnification | 0.2 x | |
| Horizontal viewing angle | | |
| Vertical viewing angle | | |
| Diagonal viewing angle | | |
Physical data
| Weight | 245 g (8.6 oz) | 230 g (8.1 oz) |
| Maximum diameter | 68.8 mm (2.71 in) | 70 mm (2.8 in) |
| Length | 63 mm (2.5 in) | |
| Filter diameter | 52 mm | |
Accessories
| Lens case | | |
| Lens hood | EW-68B | EW-68B |
Retail information
| Release date | March 1987 | October 1988 |
| Currently in production? | No No | |
| MSRP yen | 34,700 | 27,400 |
