= Canon EF 90–300mm lens =

Zoom lens for Canon DSLR

The Canon EF 90–300mm f/4.5–5.6 lens is a telephoto zoom lens for Canon EOS single-lens reflex cameras with an EF lens mount. There have been two versions available: one with and one without USM.

== Specifications ==
Attribute	f/4.5–5.6 USM	f/4.5–5.6
Image		
Key features
Full-frame compatible	Yes Yes	
Image stabilizer	No No	
Environmental Sealing	No No	
Ultrasonic Motor	Yes Yes	No No
L-series	No No	
Diffractive Optics	No No	
Technical data
Aperture (max–min)	f/4.5–5.6 – f/38–45	
Construction	9 groups / 13 elements	
# of diaphragm blades	7(circular aperture)	
Closest focusing distance	1.5 m (4.9 ft)	
Max. magnification	0.25x	
Horizontal viewing angle		
Diagonal viewing angle		
Vertical viewing angle		
Physical data
Weight	420 g (0.93 lb)	
Maximum diameter	71 mm (2.8 in)	
Length	114.7 mm (4.52 in)	
Filter diameter	58 mm	
Accessories
Lens hood	ET-60	ET-60
Retail information
Release date	September 2002	September 2003
Currently in production?	No No	
MSRP yen	40,000 (w/case and hood)	40,000 (w/case)
