= Canon EF 28-200mm lens =

Canon DSLR EF mount lens

The EF28-200mm f/3.5-5.6 USM lens was a superzoom lens made by Canon Inc.

The lens has an EF-type mount, which fits the Canon EOS line of cameras. Due to its big focal range, it is useful for travel photography. One review rated the image quality of this lens as poor.

This lens has covered roughly the same focal length range for 35 mm (full frame) like the EF-S 18–135mm lens is currently covering for cropped sensor (35 mm equivalent focal length: 29–216mm). The EF-S 18–135mm lens is one of the standard lenses, often sold with Canon EF-S cameras as bundle. Currently a similar lenses are available for cameras with Canon EF lens mount only from third-party manufacturers. Available Canon lenses, which have the closest focal length are e.g. the EF 28–300mm lens, which is much heavier, or the EF 70–200mm f/4L.

== Specifications ==
Attribute	f/3.5–5.6	f/3.5–5.6 USM
Key features
Full-frame compatible	Yes	
Image stabilizer	No	
Ultrasonic Motor	No	Yes
Stepping Motor	No	
L-series	No	
Technical data
Focal length	28–200 mm	
Aperture (max/min)	f/3.5–5.6 / f/22–36	
Construction	16 elements / 12 groups	
# of diaphragm blades	6	
Closest focusing distance	0.45 m (1.5 ft)	
Max. magnification	0.28 ×	
Physical data
Weight	495 g (17.5 oz)	500 g (18 oz)
Maximum diameter	78.4 mm (3.09 in)	
Length	89.6 mm (3.53 in)	
Filter diameter	72 mm	
Retail information
Release date	September 2000	
Currently in production?	No	
MSRP US$	-	72,000 yen
