= Canon EF 8-15mm lens =

Canon fisheye lens

EF8–15mm f/4L FISHEYE USM
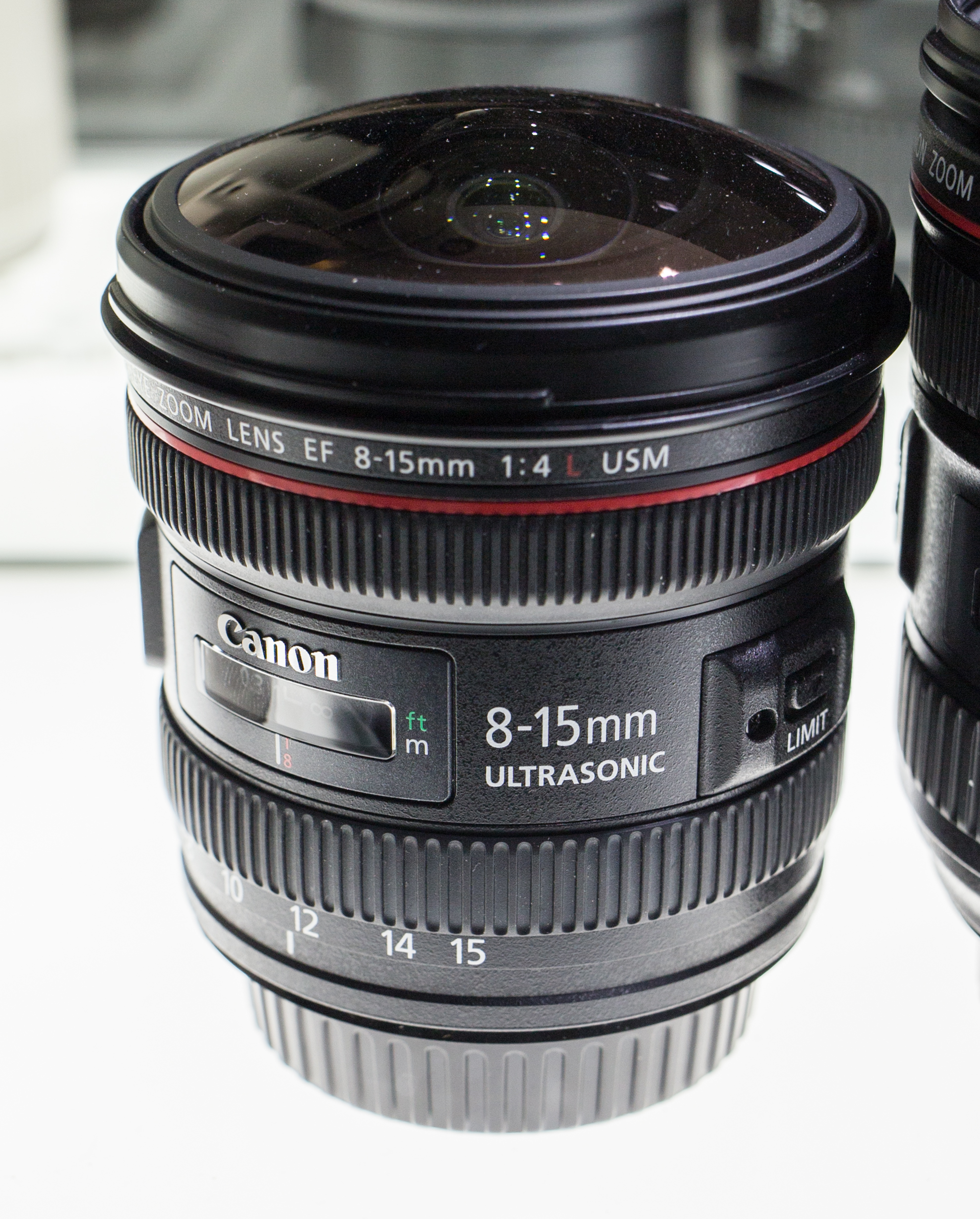
- Maker: Canon

Technical data
- Type: Zoom
- Focus drive: Ultrasonic motor
- Focal length: 8–15mm
- Crop factor: 1
- Aperture (max/min): f/4
- Close focus distance: 0.16 m (6.2 in)
- Max. magnification: 0.34 (at 15 mm)
- Construction: 14 elements in 11 groups

Features
- Short back focus: No No
- Lens-based stabilization: No No
- Macro capable: No No
- Unique features: Fisheye, L-Series
- Application: Special Effect

Physical
- Max. length: 83.0 mm (3.7 in)
- Diameter: 78.5 mm (3.1 in)
- Weight: 540 g

Angle of view
- Diagonal: 180°

History
- Introduction: 2010

Retail info
- MSRP: 1,399 USD

The EF8–15mm f/4L FISHEYE USM is a fisheye zoom lens for Canon digital single-lens reflex cameras (DSLRs) with an EF lens mount. It delivers 180° diagonal angle of view images for all EOS SLR cameras with imaging formats ranging from full-frame to APS-C, and provides 180° circular fisheye images for full-frame EOS models. Announced by Canon in 2010, it features UD glass for suppression of chromatic aberration and a subwavelength coating for reduced ghosting. It has full-time manual focus for instant switching from AF to Manual operation.

== Firsts ==
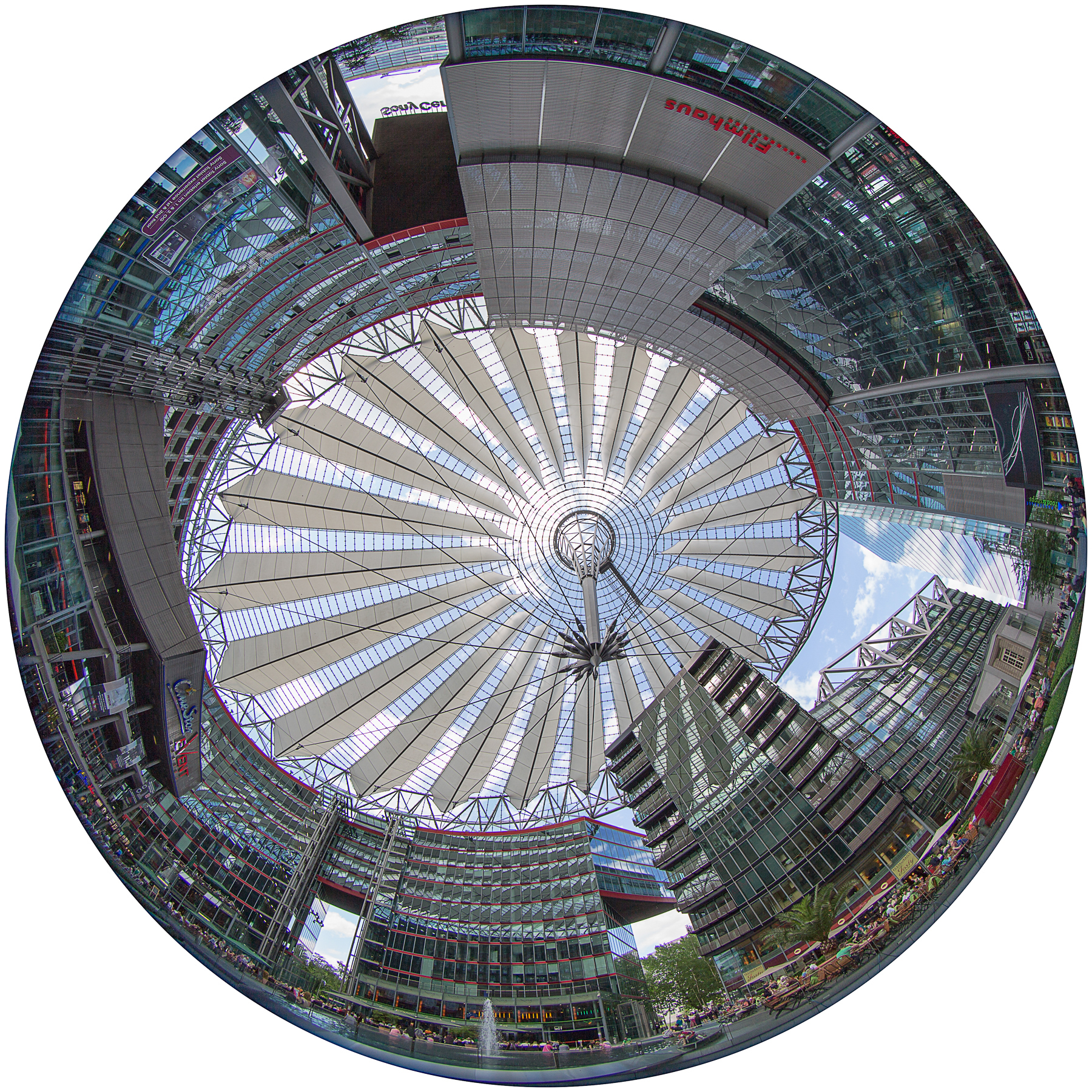
Sony Centre Berlin - Canon 8-15 Fisheye

This lens broke new market ground in several respects:

- It is the first Canon EF lens to offer 180° circular fisheye images for full frame image sensors. Note Canon had a circular fisheye lens for the FD mount.
- It is the first zoom fisheye lens for any DSLR to offer a full 180° angle of view in both circular and rectangular image formats.
- It is the first lens by any manufacturer to offer a 180° angle of view for APS-H (1.3x crop factor) bodies.
- Also, it is the first zoom fisheye lens to offer a 180° angle of view on both full-frame and cropped bodies.
