= Canon EF 35–80mm lens =

Canon SLR EF mount standard zoom lens

The EF 35-80mm f/4-5.6 USM lens is a family of EF mount wide-to-normal zoom lenses manufactured and sold by Canon. There were five versions made. One contained a piezoelectric motor, three contained a micro motor, and one contained a USM motor.

== Specifications ==
Attribute	f/4-5.6 PZ	f/4-5.6	f/4-5.6 USM	f/4-5.6 II	f/4-5.6 III
Image					
Key features
Full-frame compatible	Yes Yes				
Image stabilizer	No No				
Environmental Sealing	No No				
Ultrasonic Motor	No No		Yes Yes	No No	
L-series	No No				
Diffractive Optics	No No				
Technical data
Aperture (max–min)	f/4-5.6–f/32				
Construction	7 groups / 7 elements	8 groups / 8 elements			
# of diaphragm blades	5				
Closest focusing distance	0.5 m (1.6 ft)	0.37 m (1.2 ft)			0.4 m (1.3 ft)
Max. magnification	0.18x	0.25x			0.23x
Horizontal viewing angle	54°–30°				
Diagonal viewing angle	63°–17°				
Vertical viewing angle	38°–25°				
Physical data
Weight	205 g (0.452 lb)	180 g (0.40 lb)	170 g (0.37 lb)		175 g (0.386 lb)
Maximum diameter	68 mm (2.7 in)	68.6 mm (2.70 in)	65 mm (2.6 in)		
Length	72 mm (2.8 in)	61 mm (2.4 in)			63.5 mm (2.50 in)
Filter diameter	52 mm				
Accessories
Lens hood	ES-62 with 62-L adapter	EW-62	EW-54II	EW-54II	EW-54II
Retail information
Release date	March 1990	September 1990	April 1992	September 1993	March 1995
Currently in production?	No No				
MSRP US$	26,000 yen	22,000 yen	26,000 yen	$159.00	?
