= Canon EF 70–210mm lens =

Canon SLR EF-mount zoom lens

The EF 70–210mm lens is a discontinued telephoto zoom lens made by Canon Inc. It came in two different versions.

== Details ==
The lens has an EF mount and works with EOS film and digital cameras.

The lens comes in two different versions:

- Canon EF 70–210mm f/4 AFD (1987–1990)
- Canon EF 70–210mm f/3.5–4.5 USM (introduced 1990)

The variable-aperture USM model utilizes a rotating ring instead of a push-pull system for adjusting zoom.

The lens was superseded by the 80–200mm lens and the 70–200mm lenses.

== Specifications ==
Attribute	f/4	f/3.5-4.5 USM
Image		
Key features
Full-frame compatible	Yes Yes	
Image stabilizer	No No	
Ultrasonic Motor	No No	Yes Yes
L-series	No No	
Diffractive Optics	No No	
Macro	Yes Yes	No No
Technical data
Aperture max	f/4	f/3.5-4.5
Aperture min	f/32	f/29
Construction	8 groups / 11 elements	10 groups / 14 elements
# of diaphragm blades	8	
Closest focusing distance	1.2 m (3.9 ft)	
Max. magnification	0.24x	0.17x
Horizontal viewing angle	29°–9°20'	
Diagonal viewing angle	34°–11°20'	
Vertical viewing angle	19°30'–6°20'	
Physical data
Weight	605 g (1.334 lb)	550 g (1.21 lb)
Maximum diameter	73 mm (2.9 in)	75.6 mm (2.98 in)
Length	137.6 mm (5.42 in)	121.5 mm (4.78 in)
Filter diameter	58 mm	
Accessories
Lens hood	ET-62II	ET-65II
Case	N/A	LH-C16 or ES-C17
Retail information
Release date	May 1987	June 1990
MSRP (yen)	56,600	50,000
Street price $	N/A	N/A
