= Canon EF 20mm lens =

Canon EF 20 mm lens
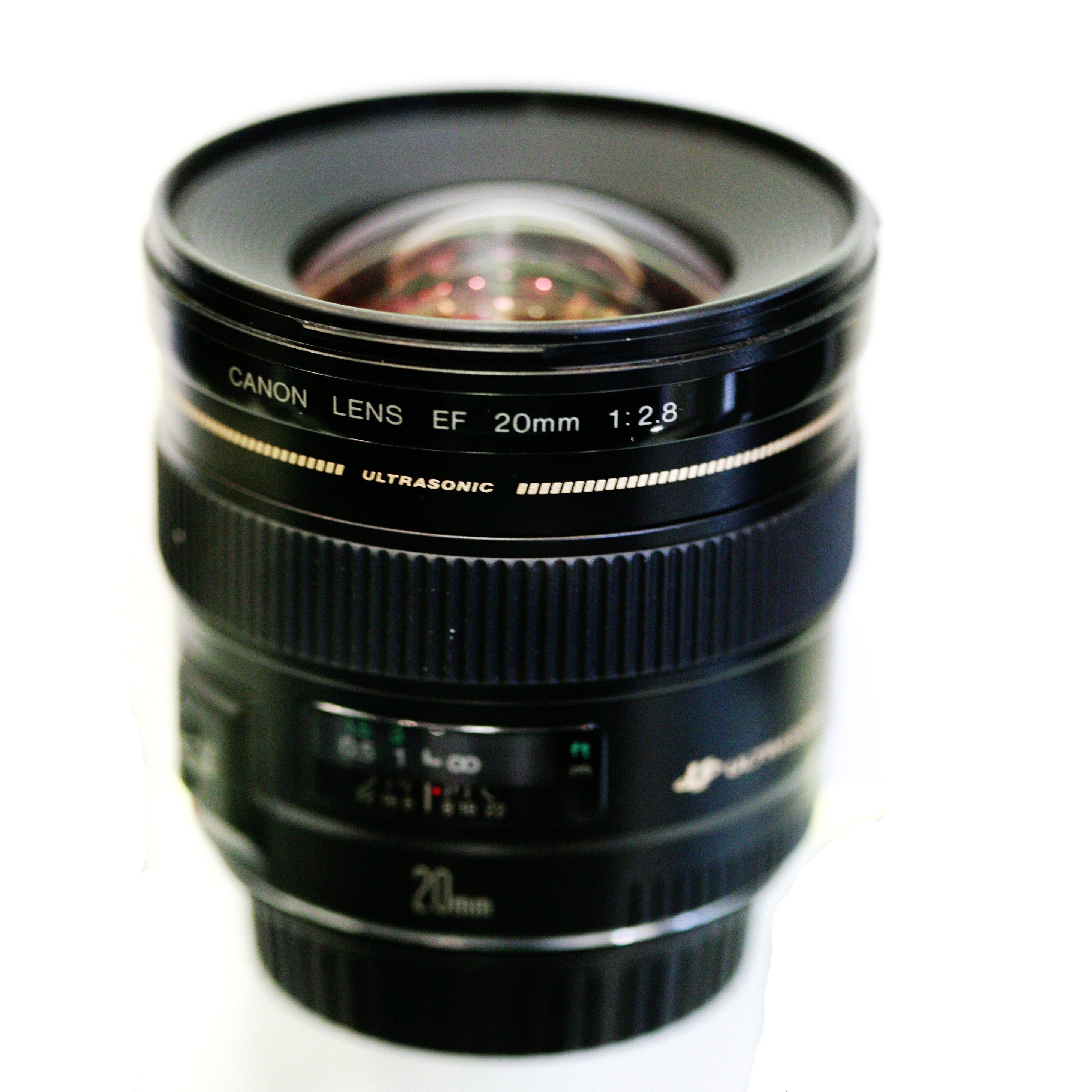
- Maker: Canon

Technical data
- Type: wide-angle prime lens
- Focus drive: Ultrasonic motor
- Focal length: 20 mm
- Crop factor: 1.0
- Aperture (max/min): f/ 2.8 - f/ 22
- Close focus distance: 0.25 m (0.82 ft)
- Max. magnification: 0.14x
- Diaphragm blades: 6
- Construction: 11 elements in 9 groups

Features
- Short back focus: No No
- Lens-based stabilization: No No
- Macro capable: No No
- Application: interiors, reportage, general

Physical
- Max. length: 70.6 mm (2.78 in)
- Diameter: 77.5 mm (3.05 in)
- Weight: 405 g (14.3 oz)
- Filter diameter: 72 mm

Accessories
- Lens hood: EW-75II

Angle of view
- Horizontal: 84°
- Vertical: 62°
- Diagonal: 94°

History
- Introduction: June 1992

Retail info
- MSRP: 75,000 yen USD

The Canon EF 20 mm f/2.8 USM lens is an ultra-wide-angle prime lens produced by Canon for the EF lens mount. It features an ultrasonic motor. On a camera with an APS-C sensor the focal length is equivalent to 32 mm, and it is classified as a wide-lens. It features a ring-type USM motor featuring full-time manual and a fixed front element. The optical scheme of the lens includes eleven element in nine groups without any special lens. The performances are considered good, but not enough to compete with modern prime lenses; some zoom lenses from the Canon L series offer similar performances.
