= Canon EF 28-90mm lens =

Canon SLR EF mount zoom lens

EF 28–90mm f/4–5.6 II USM EF 28–90mm f/4–5.6 III
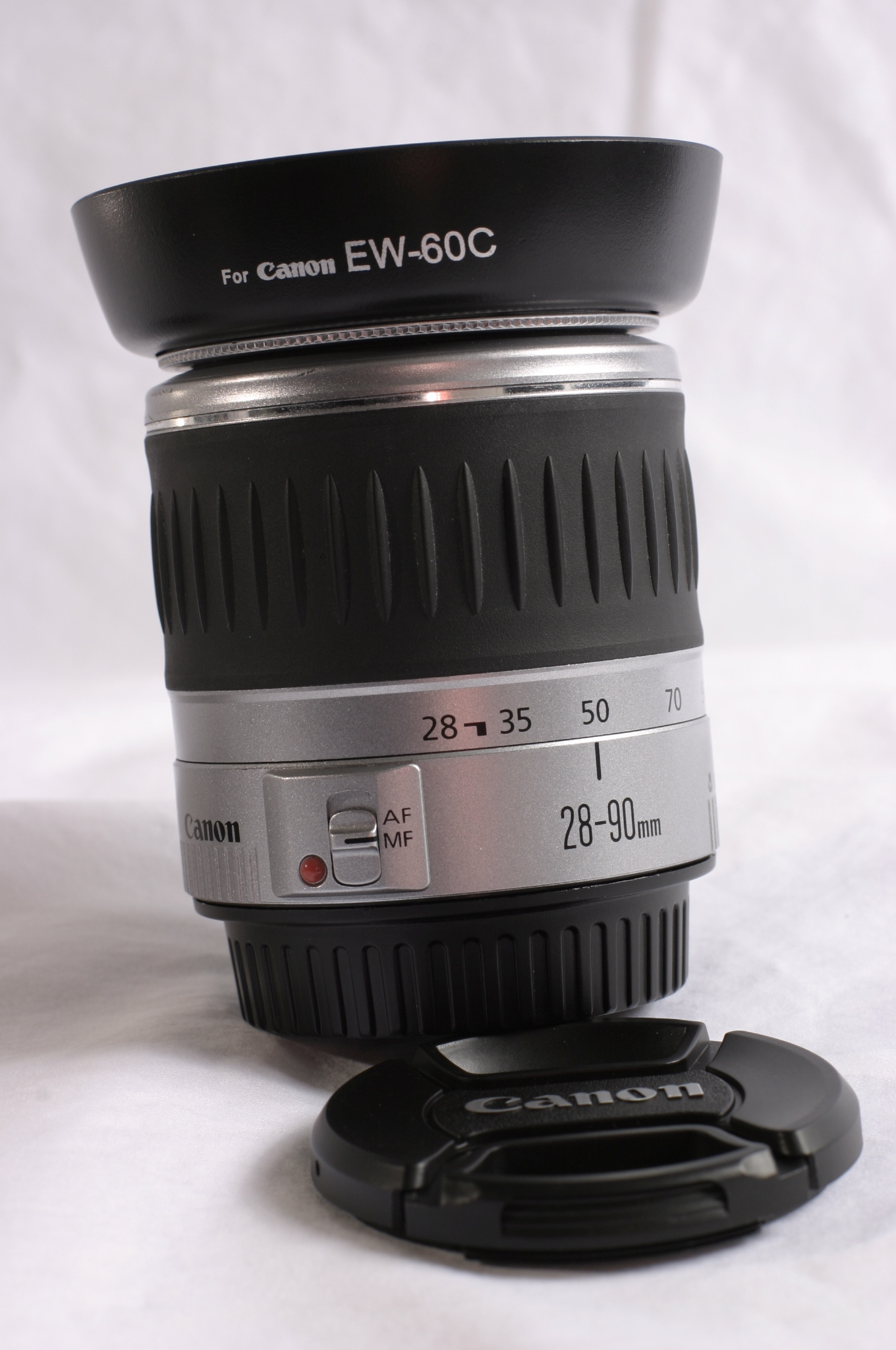
- Maker: Canon

Technical data
- Focus drive: Utrasonic motor
- Focal length: 28–90 mm
- Aperture (max/min): f/4 / f/32
- Close focus distance: 0.38 m / 1.3 ft
- Max. magnification: 0.30 (at 90 mm)
- Diaphragm blades: 5
- Construction: 10 elements in 8 groups

Features
- Short back focus: No No
- Lens-based stabilization: No No
- Macro capable: No No

Physical
- Max. length: 71 mm / 2.8 in
- Diameter: 67 mm / 2.6 in
- Weight: 190 g / 6.7 oz
- Filter diameter: 58 mm

Accessories
- Lens hood: EW-60C

Angle of view
- Horizontal: 65°–22°40'
- Vertical: 46°–15°10'
- Diagonal: 75°–27°

Retail info
- MSRP: $189.99 USD

The Canon EF 28–90mm f/4–5.6 is a full frame SLR zoom lens, also often included as a kit lens with Canon EOS film cameras.

The maximum aperture is f/4 at 28mm, reducing to f/5.6 at 90mm. When set to 90mm, this will create a moderate amount of background blur for portrait photography.

There are several versions of this lens. They all share an identical optical design of 10 lenses in 8 groups and 5 aperture petals. Versions I and II were available with either a DC auto focus motor or an ultrasonic USM motor. All other differences are purely cosmetic. All versions had plastic lens mounts and barrels. Some were available in silver or black color.

The lens is a very lightweight design, and has fast auto focus even without USM. Image quality suffers, though, particularly between 28–35mm and 80–90mm, and there is heavy vignetting when used wide open.

For digital EOS cameras with APS-C sensors, the EF-S 18–55mm lens covers the same focal length range. This is due to crop factor. EF-S lenses only work with Canon 1.6x crop cameras, which results in an angle of view roughly equivalent to that of a 29–90mm lens on a 35mm camera. Like the 28–90mm, the 18–55mm is also a kit lens.

== See also ==
- Canon EF 28–105mm lens
