= Canon EF 50-200mm lens =

Canon DSLR EF mount lens

The Canon EF 50-200mm f/3.5-4.5 is an EF mount normal-to-telephoto zoom lens. It is one of the first lenses in the Canon EF series.

In June 1988, Canon announced the EF 50-200mm f/3.5-4.5L lens. This lens has very similar physical qualities compared to the EF50-200mm f/3.5-4.5. The main difference is that this is an L lens, meaning that the lens contains special lens elements which better correct for various aberrations. In the case of the EF 50-200mm 3.5-4.5 L, both an ultra-low dispersion ("UD") and a synthetic crystal fluorite ("Fluorite") were used. Aside from the different optical construction and slight variation in weight and length, the L and non-L lenses were basically identical. Note that at this time period Canon did not protect its L zooms against adverse elements such as weather. Both this lens and the similar duo EF 100-300mm 5.6 and its L variant lacked weather sealing construction, sharing the same housing as their non-L counterparts. Canon did, however, supply the L versions with lens hoods and cases at the time of purchase, which were available for the non-L lenses for separate purchase.

== Specifications ==
Attribute	f/3.5-4.5	f/3.5-4.5L
Image		
Key features
Full-frame compatible	Yes Yes	
Image stabilizer	No No	
Ultrasonic Motor	No No	
Stepping Motor	No No	
L-series	No No	Yes Yes
Macro	No No	
Technical data
Focal length	50 mm–200 mm	
Aperture (max/min)	f/3.5–f/4.5 / f/29	
Construction	16 elements / 13 groups	16 elements / 14 groups
# of diaphragm blades	8	
Closest focusing distance	1.2 m (3.9 ft)	
Max. magnification	0.23 x	
Horizontal viewing angle		
Vertical viewing angle		
Diagonal viewing angle		
Physical data
Weight	690 g (24 oz)	695 g (24.5 oz)
Maximum diameter	75.6 mm (2.98 in)	
Length	146.4 mm (5.76 in)	145.8 mm (5.74 in)
Filter diameter	58 mm	
Accessories
Lens case		
Lens hood		
Retail information
Release date	December 1987	June 1988
Currently in production?	No No	
MSRP yen	72,100	105,500
