= Canon EF 28-80mm lens =

Canon SLR EF mount zoom lens

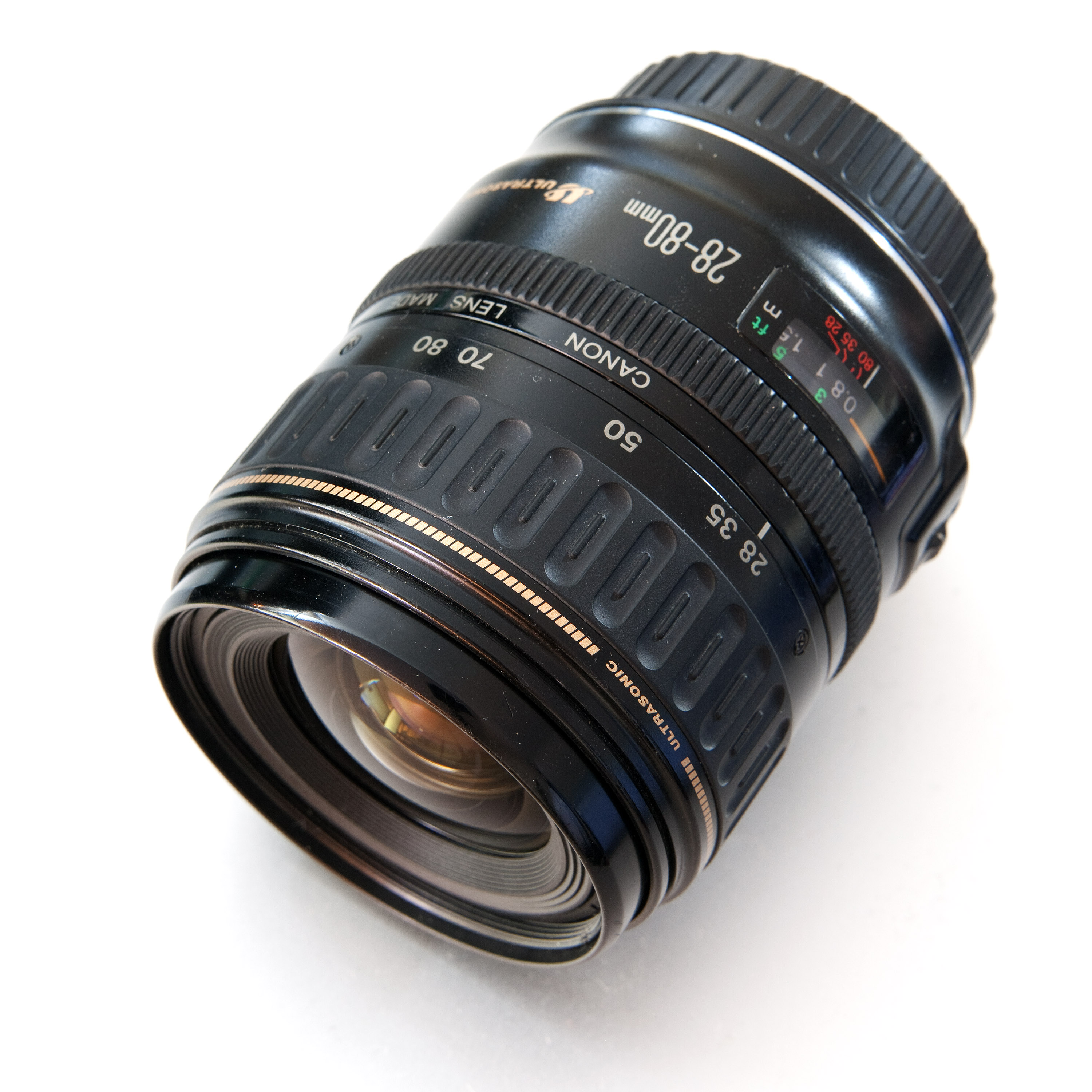
Canon EF 28-80mm f/3.5-5.6 USM.

The EF 28–80mm f/3.5–5.6 is a zoom lens produced by Canon Inc. for their series of EOS single-lens reflex cameras. Canon produced eight iterations of the lens from 1989 to 1999.

The other 28–80mm lens is the EF 28–80mm f/2.8–4L USM, which was an EF mount wide-to-normal zoom lens introduced by Canon in April 1989. Being of the "L" class, it is of completely different design and structure than the aforementioned 28–80mm f/3.5–5.6 lens. This lens was replaced by the EF 28-70mm f/2.8L USM.

== Description ==
The 'L' lens is identified by a red stripe around the lens barrel. It is a totally separate classification of lens, much larger and up to three times heavier, sharing very little if any features with the non-L versions. The L version is considerably faster, with an aperture range of f/2.8–4.0 (as opposed to f/3.5–5.6). Unlike newer L-series lenses, it is not a constant aperture lens; the maximum aperture of this lens varied with the zoom (f/2.8 @ 28 mm, f/4.0 @ 80 mm). It uses a ring USM, and as several early professional USM lenses, manual focus is performed with a "focus by wire" arrangement. The manual focus ring is a digital input that directs the lens computer to adjust focus using the autofocus motor. This was done to allow full-time manual focus with the relatively new ultrasonic motors. This lens predates the lower cost, non-L versions and production of this version ended in approximately 1996.

The first iteration of the f/3.5–5.6 ("USM" in the chart below) non-L lens is identified by the metal mount and distance scale. The initial USM version, while much smaller and lighter in weight than the L version, is considerably larger and heavier than later versions due to the internal optics and the use of larger but quieter and faster ring motor USM. Production of the first version ended in (approximately) 1995. This lens is unique in the 28–80mm f/3.5–5.6 series.

USM versions II through V deleted the DoF window and are considerably lighter in weight and smaller in diameter. They retain the USM feature albeit with a lower-cost, slower but more compact micro-motor version. They share more in appearance with their non-USM siblings, as the body shape and weight are more like the non-USM than the first USM version. The USM II through V versions also incorporate a plastic lens mount.

Only the L and original USM lenses support full-time manual focusing (FTM), which allows the user to override autofocus simply by turning the focus ring. The USM versions II through V do not.

Even lower cost non-USM versions ("Original" and "II" in the chart below) were produced as well. Like the USM II-V versions, these non-USM versions have a plastic mount and no distance or depth of field scales.

== Table ==
Canon EF 28–80mm lens
Attribute	L	(original)	USM	II	II USM	III USM	IV USM	V USM
Key features
Image stabilizer	No							
Environmental Sealing	No							
USM	Yes	No	Yes	No	Yes			
L-series	Yes	No						
Diffractive Optics	No							
Technical data
Maximum aperture	f/2.8–4	f/3.5–5.6						
Minimum aperture	f/22	f/22–38	f/38	f/22–38	f/38			f/22–38
Filter diameter	72 mm	58 mm						
Horizontal viewing angle	75°–30°							
Vertical viewing angle	46°–17°							
Diagonal viewing angle;	65°–25°							
Physical data
Weight	945 g	200 g	330 g	200 g		205 g	200 g	
Max. Diameter	84 mm	66.4 mm	72 mm	66.4 mm	63.5 mm	65 mm	66.4 mm	
Max. Length	119.5 mm	71.2 mm	72.5 mm	71.2 mm	68.5 mm	63.5 mm	61.4 mm	
Groups/elements	11/15	10/10	9/10	10/10	9/9		10/10	
# of diaphragm blades	8	5						
Closest focusing distance	0.5 m / 1.64 ft	0.38 m / 1.25 ft	0.5 m / 1.64 ft	0.38 m / 1.25 ft				
Retail information
Release date	April 1989	September 1996	October 1991	April 1999	October 1993	August 1995	September 1996	April 1999
MSRP (yen)	160,700 yen	(overseas)	42,000 yen	(overseas)	30,000 yen			
