= Canon EF 75–300mm lens =

Series of camera lenses manufactured by Canon

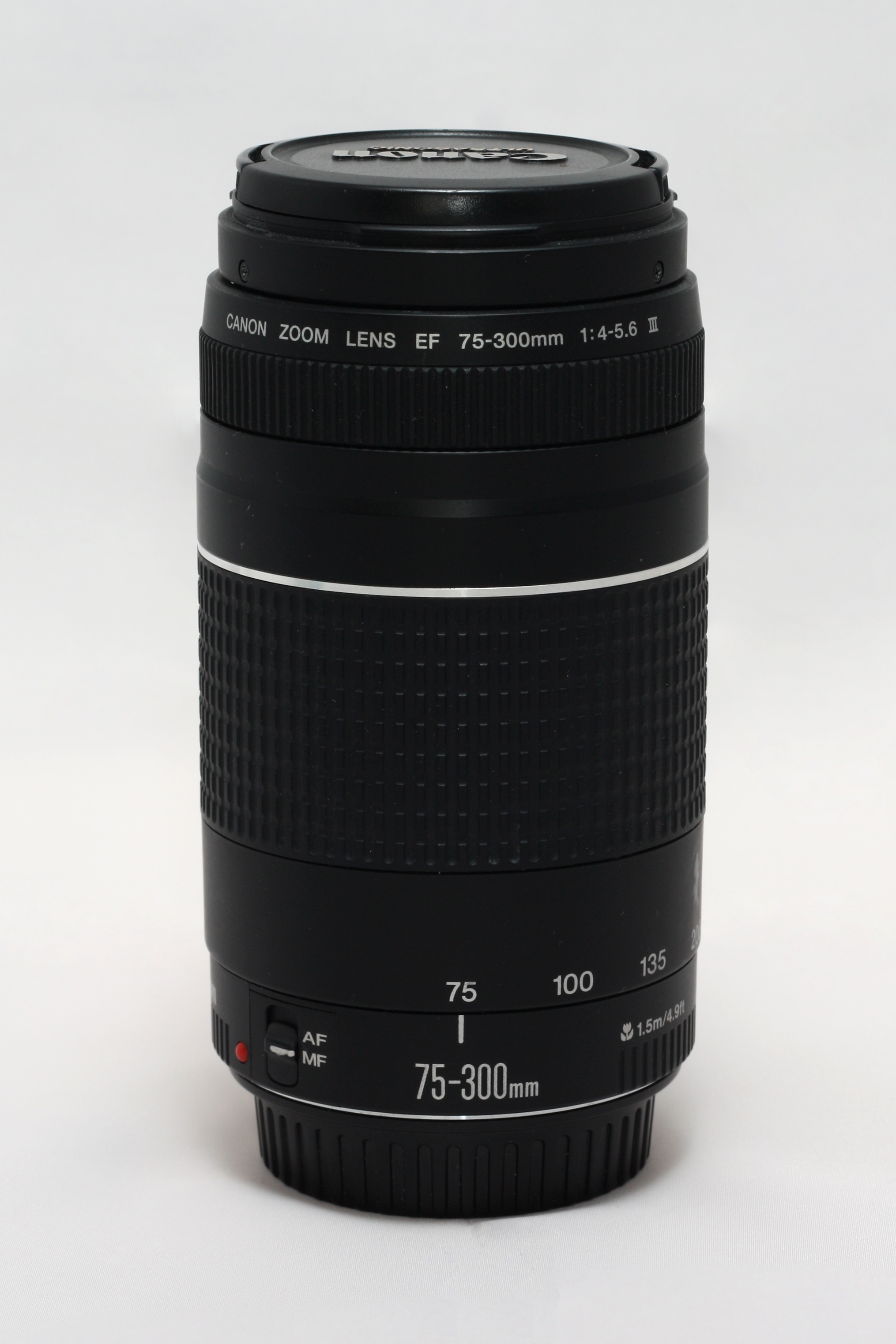
The Canon EF 75–300mm f/4–5.6 III lens.

Introduced in 1991, the Canon EF 75–300mm f/4–5.6 lens is a telephoto zoom lens for Canon EOS single-lens reflex cameras with an EF lens mount. There are 3 basic types of the lens: the IS USM (Image Stabilization, Ultra Sonic Motor), the USM (USM, no IS) and non-USM (no USM, no IS). All 3 types are generally considered to be low-end consumer-level lenses.

== Description ==
The non-USM versions are generally considered very low grade consumer lenses with the USM versions only slightly superior in build quality and 'feel'. None of the versions (USM or not) support full-time manual (FTM) focusing. The optics are similar in the IS USM and USM versions. Except for the USM III, the USM feature is signified by the gold "Ultrasonic Motor" text. The USM III is identified by a gold USM Logo and an adjacent gold marking of "Ultrasonic". The original USM lens caps also says "Ultrasonic" although caution is advised as lens caps are often swapped and should not be counted upon as indicative of the actual lens' features. Ultrasonic lenses will have in small gold font "Ultrasonic" and a series of hashed lines applied completely around the lens at the forward end.

== Specifications ==
Canon EF 75–300mm f/4–5.6 lens
Attribute	(original)	USM	IS USM	II	II USM	III	III USM
Reference							
Key features
Image stabilizer	No		Yes	No			
Environmental Sealing	No						
USM	No	Yes		No	Yes	No	Yes
L-series	No						
Diffractive Optics	No						
Technical data
Maximum aperture	f/4–5.6						
Minimum aperture	f/45		f/32-45	f/45		f/32–45	
Filter diameter	58 mm						
Horizontal viewing angle	27° - 6°50’						
Vertical viewing angle	18°11’ - 4°35’						
Diagonal viewing angle	32°11’ - 8°15’						
Physical data
Weight	500 g	495 g	650 g	480 g			
Max. Diameter	73.8mm	71.1mm	78.5mm	71mm			
Max. Length	122mm		138.2mm	122mm			
Groups/elements	9/12	9/13	10/15	9/13			
# of diaphragm blades	7		8	7			
Closest focusing distance	1.5 m						
Retail information
Release date	March 1991	June 1992	September 1995	July 1995	March 1995	April 1999	
MSRP (yen)	37,000 yen	41,000 yen	88,000 yen	(overseas)	43,800 yen	(overseas)	43,800 yen

== Reviews ==
Canon EF 75–300 Review — Lens Reviews
