= Canon EF 100–200mm lens =

Canon SLR EF-mount zoom lens

Canon EF100-200mm f/4.5A
- Maker: Canon
- Lens mount: Canon EF

Technical data
- Type: Zoom
- Focal length: 100–200 mm
- Crop factor: 1
- Aperture (max/min): f/4.5–32
- Close focus distance: 1.9 m (6.2 ft)
- Max. magnification: 0.13×
- Diaphragm blades: 8
- Construction: 10 elements in 7 groups

Features
- Weather-sealing: No No
- Lens-based stabilization: No No

Physical
- Max. length: 130.5 mm (5.14 in)
- Diameter: 74.4 mm (2.93 in)
- Weight: 520 g (1.15 lb)
- Filter diameter: 58 mm

History
- Introduction: December 1988

The Canon EF 100-200mm f/4.5A is an interchangeable telezoom lens for the Canon EOS camera system.
