= Canon EF 28-105mm lens =

Canon SLR EF-mount zoom lens

The Canon EF 28–105 mm f/4–5.6 is an inexpensive zoom lens often included as a kit lens with Canon 35 mm single-lens reflex cameras. 28–105 mm is a standard wide to telephoto zoom range. The Canon EF 28–105 mm f/3.5–4.5 USM is a higher quality zoom lens with a better build quality. Currently every version of this lens is discontinued. Some versions of the lens may include the word macro or a flower icon which indicates macro capability, however due to the 1:5.2 image magnification ratio it cannot be considered as a true macro lens.

== EF 28–105mm f/3.5–4.5 USM ==
This lens is a well-regarded consumer-grade lens. Its focus motor is ring USM, resulting in quick and quiet autofocus operation; this motor also allows the lens to offer full-time manual focusing. The lens uses internal focusing so the inner lens barrel does not rotate when focusing. This lens uses a "duo cam" type zoom barrel; this allows a more compact design, but still does not rotate while zooming.

This duo cam type zoom barrel is illustrated with the following two pictures:

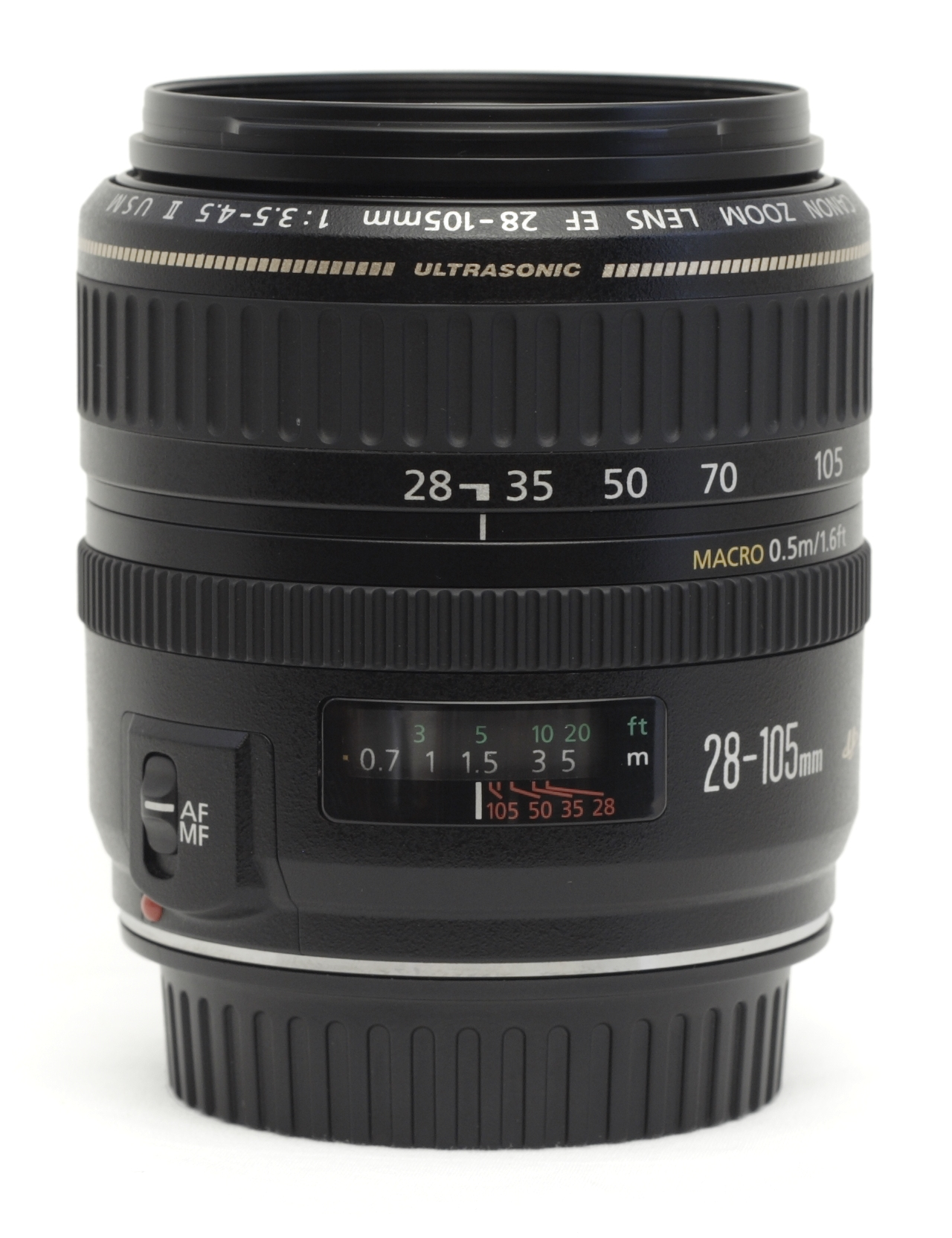
Lens at 28 mm

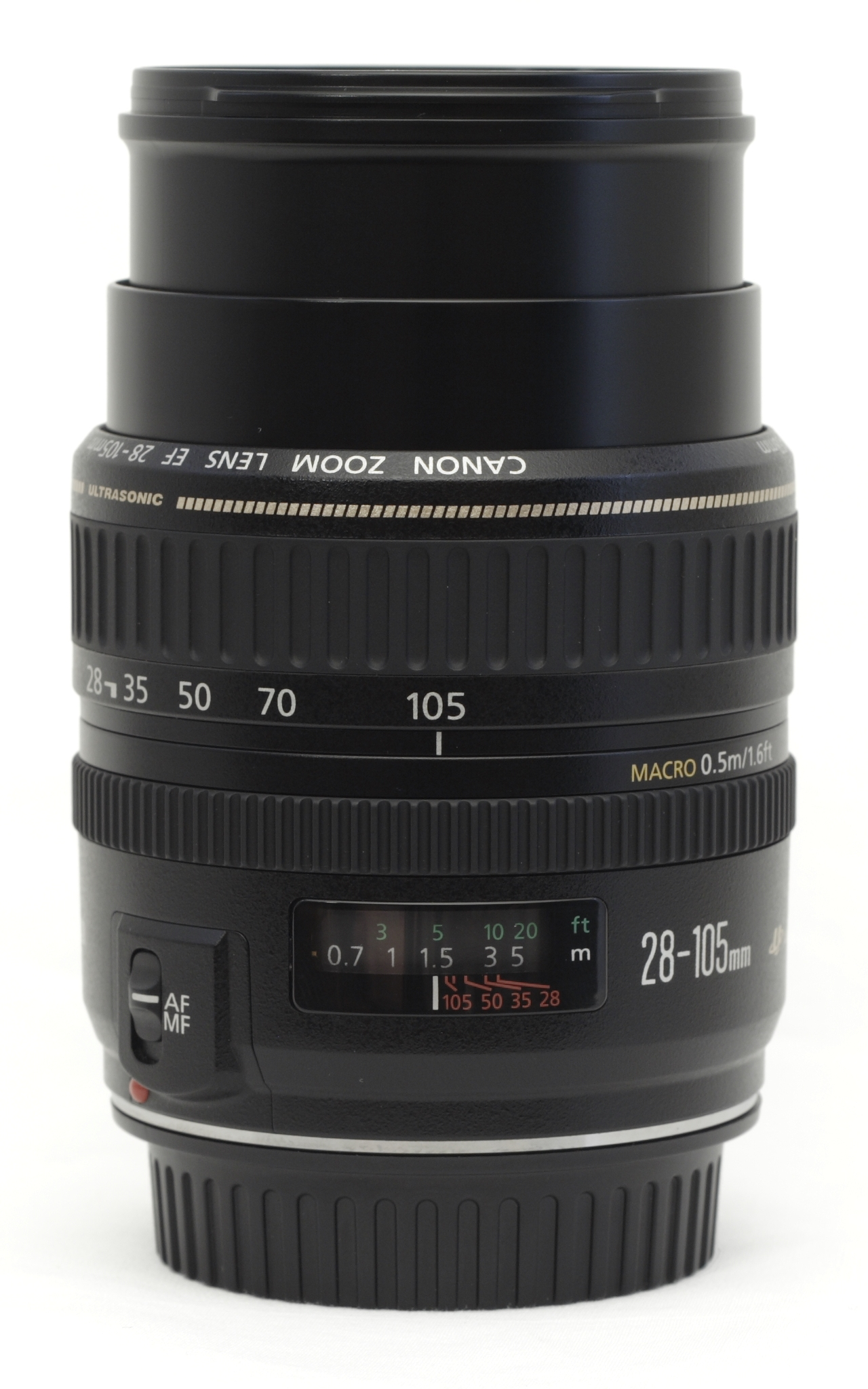
Lens at 105 mm

There are three versions of this lens. The original lens had a five-blade diaphragm, 15 elements and was manufactured in Japan until 1999. The second version (from 1999 to 2002) featured an improved 7 blade aperture, same 15 elements in 12 groups optical formula, with metal replacing plastic on many of the zoom components and "MACRO" instead of a flower marking the side. Initially there was no "II" marking on the bezel, but "LENS MADE IN JAPAN" was clearly stamped on the opposite side of the bezel., later Japanese production was marked "II USM" and "Made in Japan". These versions are considered the most collectable, as they were still manufactured in the primary lens factory in Japan. The third version (from 2003 to 2010) was manufactured and assembled in Taiwan with a 7 blade aperture, MACRO on the side, a textured case, "II" added to the description on the bezel. "Made in Taiwan" was stamped on the base of the lens. There was a final variation during the last 3 years of production where they replaced all of the gold lettering on the case with all white lettering (to cut costs).

== EF 28–105mm f/4–5.6 USM ==
These are two inexpensive versions of the 28–105mm, cosmetically similar to the EF-S 18–55mm or the 90–300mm lenses which have the characteristic rubber grip on the barrel. While retailing for around $100 less, these lenses have a decreased f-stop range and cheaper build quality (with a chrome-plated ring). The first 4–5.6 version has a DC motor for autofocus, while the second version uses a micro-USM, instead of ring USM that the 3.5–4.5 models use.

== Specifications ==
Attribute	f/4.0–5.6	f/3.5–4.5
Image		
Image stabilizer	No	
Ultrasonic Motor	Yes	
L-series	No	
Diffractive Optics	No	
Macro	No	
Maximum aperture	f/4.0-5.6	f/3.5-4.5
Minimum aperture	f/22-32	f/22-29
Max. magnification	1:5.2	
Weight	0.46 lbs. / 210 g	0.83 lbs. / 372 g
Diameter	2.6" / 6.7 cm	2.8" / 7.2 cm
Length	2.7" / 6.8 cm	3" / 7.5 cm
Filter diameter	58 mm	
Horizontal viewing angle	65°–19°20'	
Diagonal viewing angle	75°–23°30'	
Groups/elements	9/10	12/15
# of diaphragm blades	6	5 or 7
Closest focusing distance	1.57'	1.6'
MSRP	$140	$230
