= Canon EF 100-400mm lens =

Camera lens

The EF 100–400 mm f/4.5–5.6L IS USM is a professional EF mount telephoto zoom lens manufactured by Canon Inc. The first version of this lens was announced in September 1998, and an updated version was announced in November 2014. It is a high performance telephoto lens most often used for sports and wildlife photography.

== Crop factor ==
When used with a Canon APS-C (1.6× crop) DSLR camera or APS-H (1.3× crop), the field of view of this lens is equivalent to a 160–640 mm on an APS-C sensor, or 130–520 mm on an APS-H sensor. This is due to the crop factor inherent with APS-C or APS-H sensor digital SLR cameras.

== First version ==
While the original version has excellent optical performance, its design predated the mass-market availability of digital single-lens reflex cameras. The telescoping nature of the original design means that the lens zooms quickly, although not all users prefer this design. According to Roger Cicala, the head of the American lens rental house LensRentals.com,

...although it's a compromise, it’s a very good compromise. It’s nearly as sharp as the [300 mm and 400 mm] primes and far sharper than a consumer lens. The huge range means getting the shot framed just right and not having to change lenses, and it’s relatively small and easy to shoot hand-held.

The telescoping design means that the lens sucks in air when zoomed from shorter focal lengths to longer focal lengths. Unfortunately, with the lack of anything to prevent it, it also sucks in any airborne dust

This lens is compatible with the Canon Extender EF teleconverters on newer EOS bodies. Autofocus works with the 1.4× Extender (and only with cameras that can autofocus at f/8) and image stabilization (IS) works with both 1.4× and 2× Extenders.

== Version II ==
The new Canon EF 100-400mm f/4.5-5.6L IS II USM was announced on 11 November 2014 (10 November in the United States due to time zone differences from Japan), with availability expected the following month. Among the changes from the Mark I version are:

- The zoom mechanism now uses a rotating ring (like most other Canon zoom lenses), instead of a push/pull system.
- The Mark II version also features a new lens hood with a side window, making it possible to adjust specialty filters (such as polarizers and variable neutral-density filters) without removing the hood.
- The tripod mount can now be removed while the lens is attached to a camera body. The Mark I tripod mount can only be removed when the lens is detached.
- The IS system has three modes instead of the two modes of the Mark I. The third mode (which Canon calls "Mode 3"), designed with action shooting in mind, applies stabilization only during exposure. Previously, Mode 3 was available only on recent Canon supertelephoto lenses.

== Specifications ==
Attribute	f/4.5–5.6L IS USM	f/4.5–5.6L IS II USM
Image		
Key features
Full-frame compatible	Yes	Yes
Image stabilizer	Yes	Yes
Ultrasonic Motor	Yes	Yes
Stepping Motor	No	No
L-series	Yes	Yes
Environmental Sealing	No	Yes
Diffractive Optics	No	No
Macro	No	No
Push/pull zoom	Yes	No
Technical data
Aperture (max-min)	f/4.5–f/5.6 to f/32–f/38	f/4.5–f/5.6 to f/32–f/40
Construction	14 groups / 17 elements	16 groups / 21 elements
# of diaphragm blades	8	9
Closest focusing distance	5.9 ft / 1.8 m	3.2 ft / 0.98 m
Max. magnification	0.2×	0.31×
Horizontal viewing angle	20°–5°10'	
Diagonal viewing angle	24°–6°10'	
Vertical viewing angle	14°–3°30'	
Physical data
Weight	1380 g / 3.1 lbs	1570 g / 3.46 lbs
Maximum diameter	92 mm / 3.6"	94 mm / 3.7"
Length	189 mm / 7.4"	193 mm / 7.6"
Filter diameter	77 mm	
Accessories
Lens hood	ET 83C	ET 83D
Case	LZ1324	LZ1326
Retail information
Release date	September 1998	November 2014
Currently in production?	No	Yes
MSRP (US$)	$1,699	$2,199
