= Canon EF 500mm lens =

35 mm camera lens

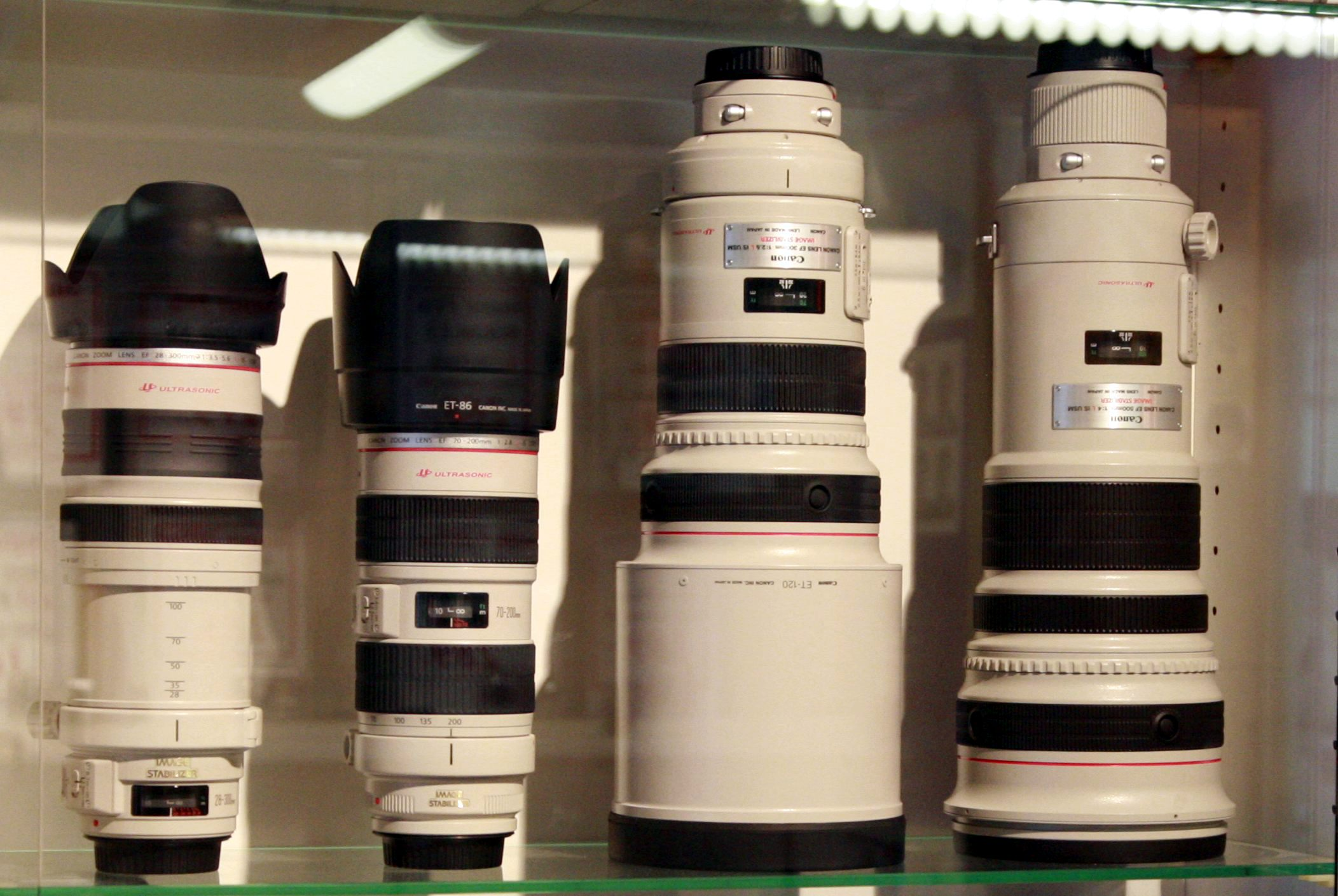
From left to right: EF 28-300mm f/3.5-5.6L IS USM, 70–200 f/2.8L IS USM, 300mm f/2.8L IS USM, 500mm f/4L IS USM

The EF 500mm lenses are a group of super-telephoto prime lenses made by Canon that share the same focal length.

These lenses have an EF type mount, and fit the Canon EOS line of digital single lens reflex cameras.

When used on a camera with a field of view compensation factor of 1.6x, such as the Canon EOS 400D, they provide a narrower field of view, equivalent to an 800 mm lens mounted on a 35mm frame body. With a 1.3x body such as the Canon EOS-1D Mark III, they provide a less narrow field of view, equivalent to a 650mm lens mounted on a 35mm frame body.

These lenses are most commonly used by sports and wildlife photographers.

Three EF 500mm lenses have been available, and all are L series lenses. The most recent, the f/4L IS II, released in 2012 and is the only model in production.

- f/4.5L USM
- f/4L IS USM
- f/4L IS II USM

== EF 500mm f/4.5L USM ==
The EF 500mm f/4.5L USM is a professional L series lens that is now discontinued. This lens is constructed with a metal body and mount, and with plastic extremities and switches. Features of this lens include a wide rubber focus ring that is damped, a distance window with infrared index, the ability to limit the focus range, a focus-preset mechanism, and the ability to set the AF speed. A 9 bladed maximum aperture of f/4.5, gives this lens the ability to create depth of field effects. The optical construction of this lens contains 8 lens elements, including one fluorite lens element, and one UD (Ultra low Dispersion) lens element. This lens uses an inner focusing system, powered by a ring type USM motor. The front of the lens does not rotate nor extend when focusing. This lens is compatible with the Canon Extender EF teleconverters.

== EF 500mm f/4L IS USM ==
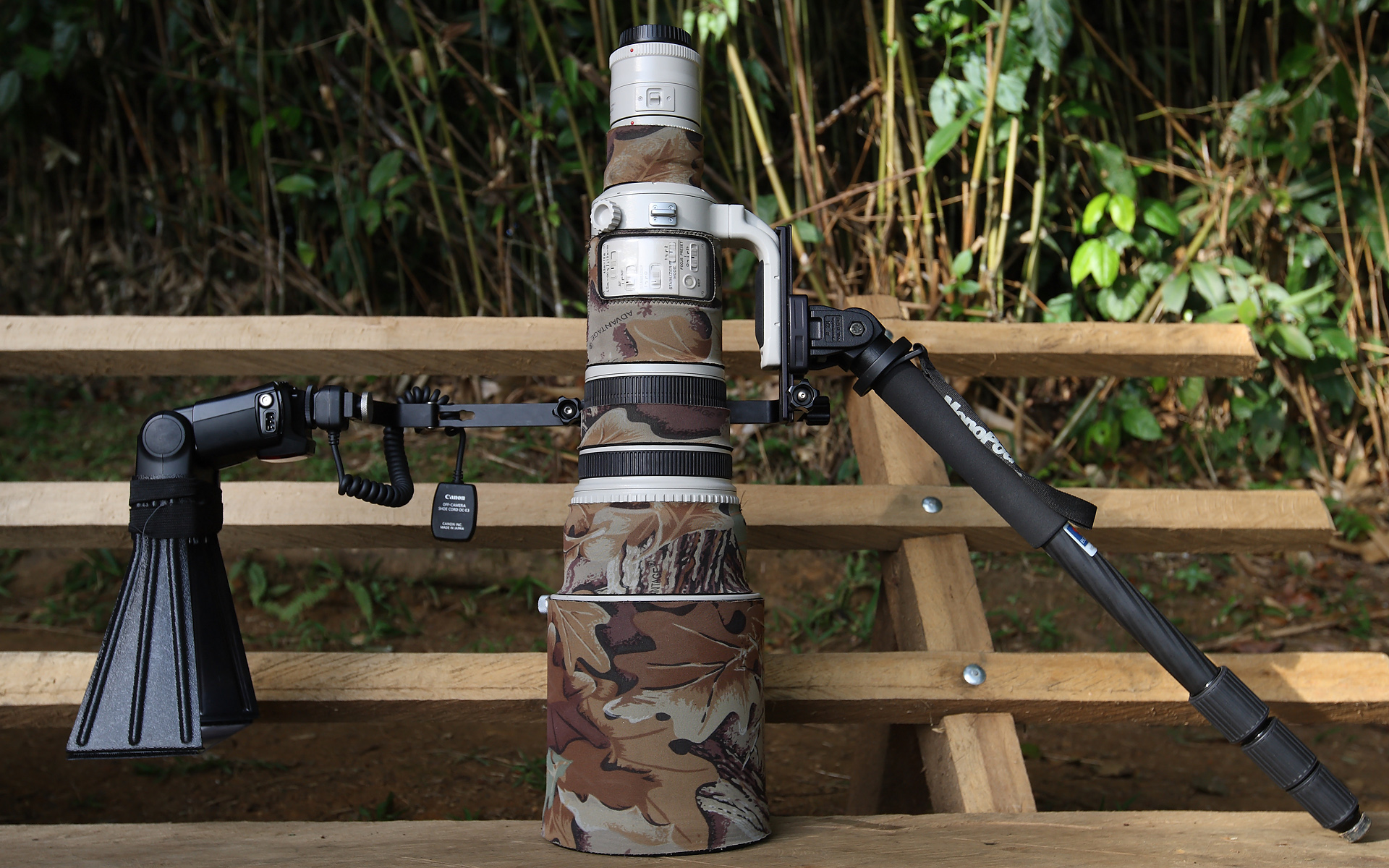
The EF 500mm f/4L IS USM with a Canon 2x Extender, rigged with flash and monopod. A typical setup for when taking photographs of birds.

The EF 500mm f/4L IS USM is a professional L series lens that was designed to replace the EF 500mm f/4.5L USM. This lens is constructed with a metal body and mount, and with plastic extremities and switches. Features of this lens are: a wide rubber focus ring that is damped, a distance window with infrared index, the ability to limit the focus range from: 4.5m to infinity, 4.5m to 10m, and 10m to infinity, it also has a focus-preset mechanism, an image stabilizer that is effective up to two stops and is tripod sensing, an AF stop switch, and weather sealing. An 8 bladed maximum aperture of f/4 gives this lens the ability to create depth of field effects. The optical construction of this lens contains 17 lens elements, including one fluorite lens element, and two UD Lens elements. This lens uses an inner focusing system, powered by a ring type USM motor. The front of the lens does not rotate nor extend when focusing. This lens is compatible with the Canon Extender EF teleconverters.

== EF 500mm f/4L IS II USM ==
The EF 500mm f/4L IS II USM is the replacement to the EF 500mm f/4L IS USM. Its specifications are roughly similar to those of the f/4 Mark I, but have a number of significant differences. The Mark II version contains one fewer lens element than its predecessor (16 as opposed to 17), and is 680 grams (1.50 lb) lighter. It also has a 9-blade aperture instead of the 8 blades of the Mark I.

== Specifications ==
Attribute	f/4.5L USM	f/4L IS USM	f/4L IS II USM
Image			
Key features
Full-frame compatible	Yes Yes		
Image stabilizer	No No	Yes Yes	
Environmental sealing	Yes Yes		
Ultrasonic Motor	Yes Yes		
Stepping Motor	No No		
L-series	Yes Yes		
Diffractive Optics	No No		
Macro	No No		
Technical data
Focal length	500 mm		
Aperture (max/min)	f/4.5 / f/32	f/4 / f/32	
Construction	8 elements / 7 groups	17 elements / 13 groups	16 elements / 12 groups
# of diaphragm blades	9	8	9 (circular aperture)
Closest focusing distance	5 m (16.45 ft)	4.5 m (14.8 ft)	3.7 m (12.14 ft)
Max. magnification	0.11×	0.12×	0.15×
Horizontal viewing angle	4°00'		
Vertical viewing angle	2°45'		
Diagonal viewing angle	5°00'		
Physical data
Weight	3 kg (6.61 lbs)	3.87 kg (8.53 lbs)	3.19 kg (7.03 lbs)
Maximum diameter	130 mm (4.7")	146 mm (5.75")	
Length	390 mm (16.0")	387 mm (15.9")	383 mm (15.8")
Filter diameter	48 mm (rear)	52 mm (drop-in filter)	
Accessories
Lens case	?	500	500B
Lens hood	ET-123B	ET-138	ET-138(WII)
Lens cap	?	E-163	E-163B
Retail information
Release date	March 1992	July 1999	May 2011
Currently in production?	No No		No No
MSRP US$	750,000 yen (w/case)	$5500	$8,999.00
