= Canon EF 180mm f/3.5L Macro USM lens =

Canon SLR EF-mount macro prime lens

EF 180mm Macro USM
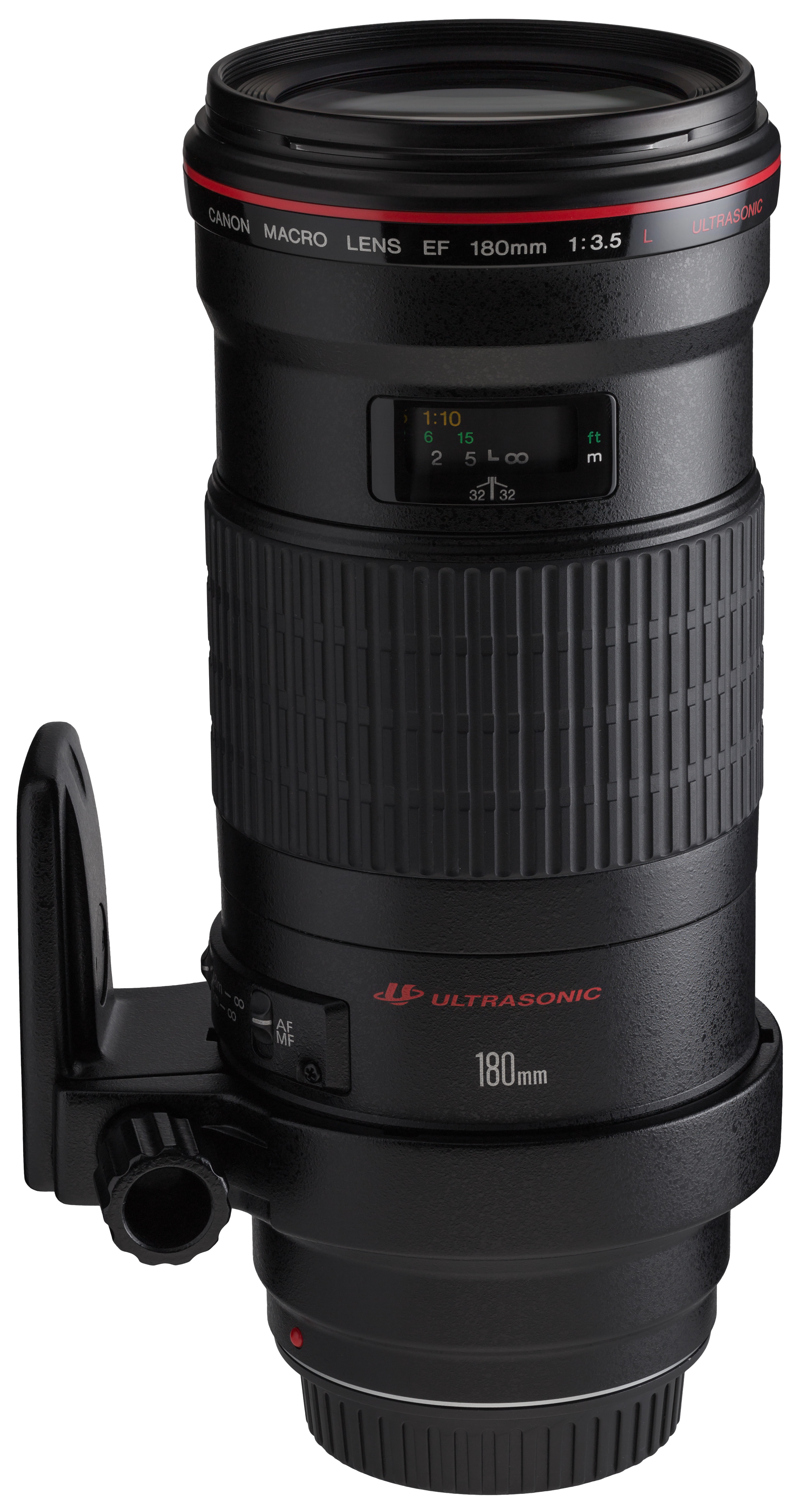
- Maker: Canon

Technical data
- Type: Prime
- Focus drive: Ultrasonic motor
- Focal length: 180 mm
- Crop factor: 1.0
- Aperture (max/min): f/3.5–f/32
- Close focus distance: 480 mm / 1.5ft
- Max. magnification: 1:1
- Construction: 14 elements in 12 groups

Features
- Short back focus: No No
- Lens-based stabilization: No No
- Macro capable: Yes Yes
- Unique features: 1:1 macro
- Application: Macro

Physical
- Max. length: 7.4in / 188 mm
- Diameter: 3.3in / 84 mm
- Weight: 1.09kg / 38.2oz
- Filter diameter: 72 mm

Accessories
- Lens hood: ET-78

Angle of view
- Diagonal: 11°

History
- Introduction: 1996
- Discontinuation: 2021

Retail info
- MSRP: $1200 USD

The Canon EF 180/3.5L Macro USM lens is the longest macro lens made by Canon in the EF mount, and is one of Canon's L series range of professional camera lenses. The lens is compatible with the Canon Extender EF teleconverters. Canon discontinued manufacture of the lens in 2021.
