= Nikon AF Zoom-Nikkor 35-70 mm f/3.3-4.5 =

AF Nikkor 35-70 mm f/3.3-4.5
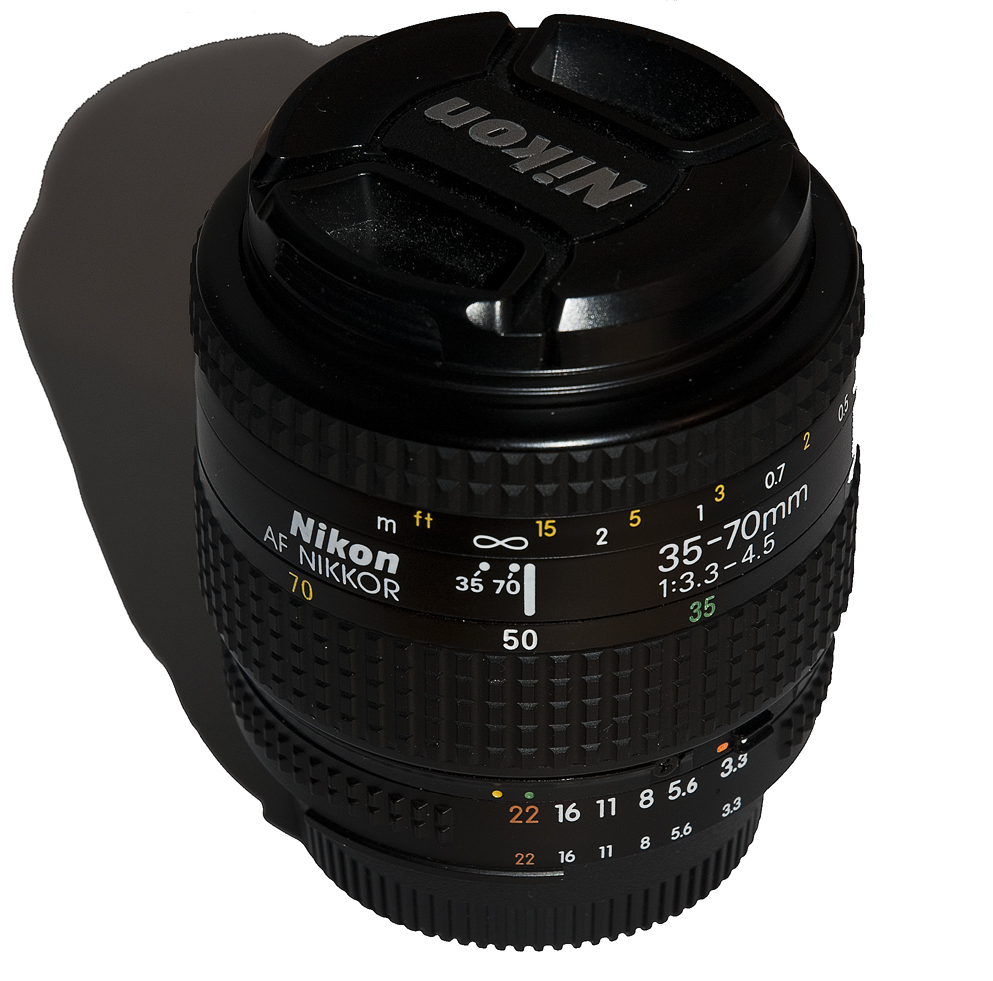
- Maker: Nikon
- Lens mount: F-mount

Technical data
- Type: Zoom
- Focus drive: Screw drive
- Focal length: 35 - 70mm
- Image format: FX (full-frame)
- Aperture (max/min): f/3.3 - f/22
- Close focus distance: 0.5m (normal); 0.35m (macro)
- Diaphragm blades: 6
- Construction: 8 elements in 7 groups

Features
- Lens-based stabilization: No No
- Macro capable: Yes Yes
- Aperture ring: Yes Yes
- Application: Zoom Lens

Physical
- Max. length: 69mm
- Diameter: 70.5mm
- Weight: 260g
- Filter diameter: 52mm

Accessories
- Lens hood: HN-2
- Case: CL-32S

Angle of view
- Diagonal: 63.4 - 34.3

History
- Introduction: 1986

The Nikon AF Zoom-Nikkor 35–70 mm f/3.3-4.5 is one of Nikon's zoom lenses for the 35mm format. The combination of low cost and convenience makes this a popular lens among many photographers.

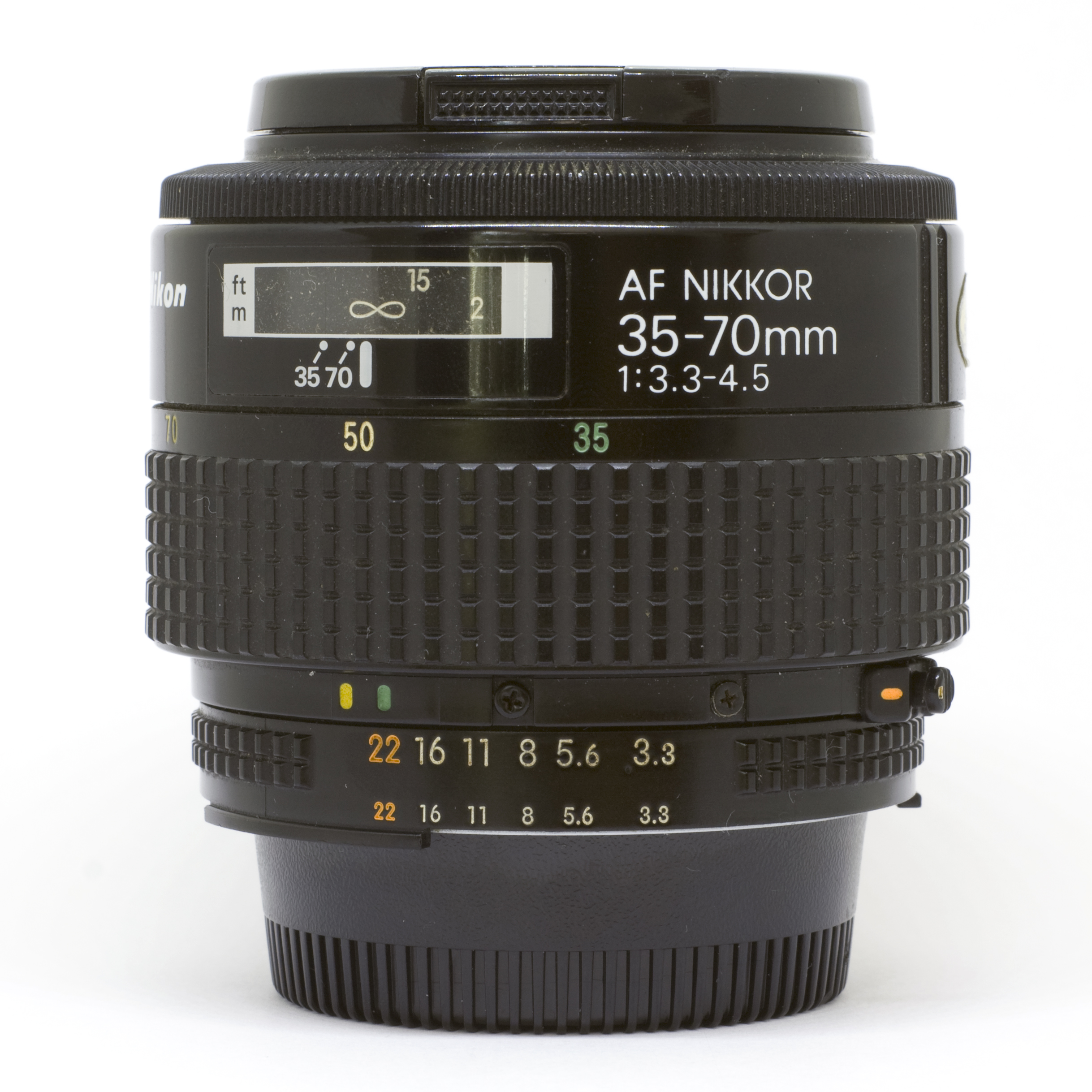
Nikon AF Nikkor 35-70 mm 1:3.3-4.5 (I) Lens

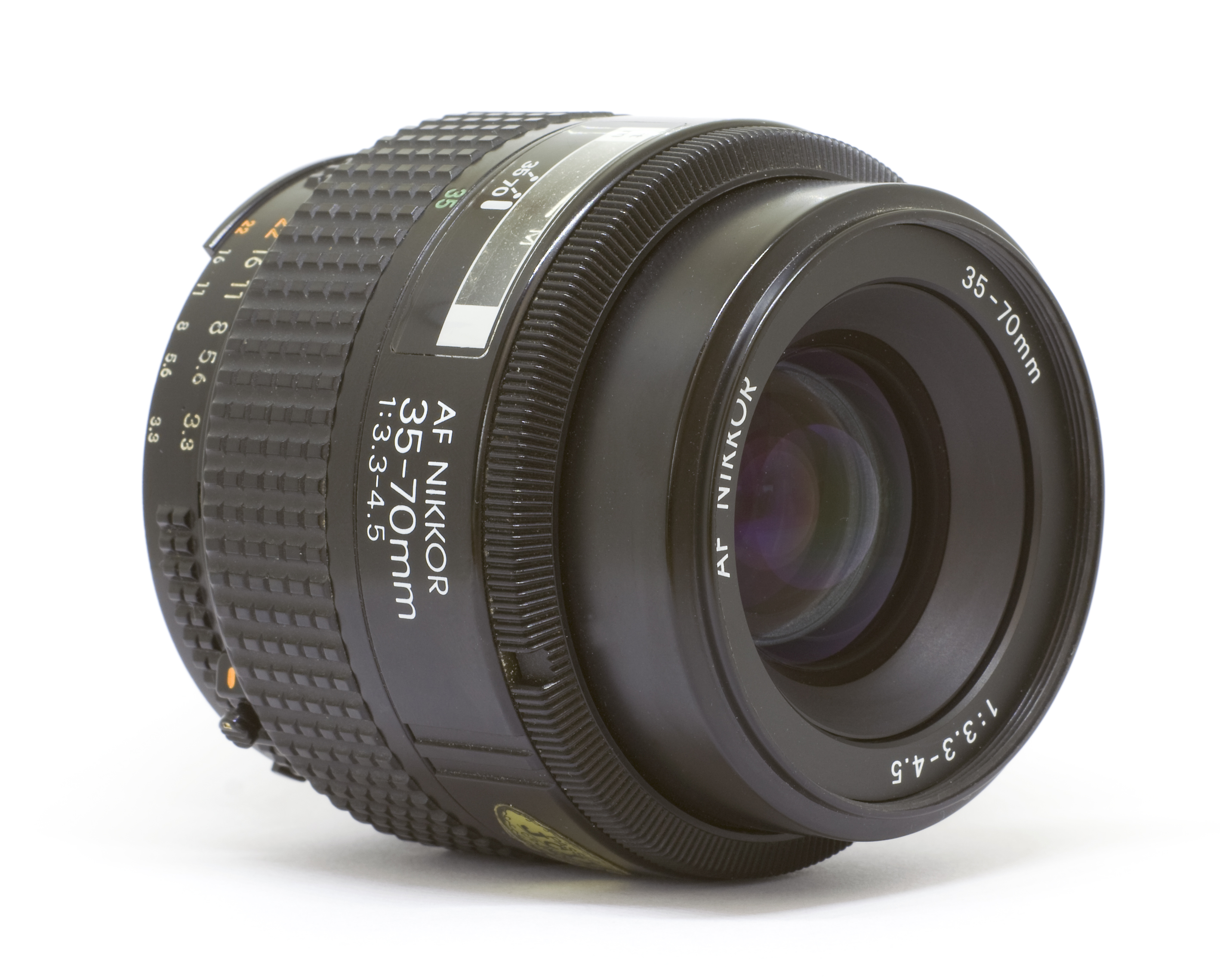
Nikon AF Nikkor 35-70 mm 1:3.3-4.5 (I) Lens
