= Canon EF 800mm lens =

Canon SLR EF-mount super-telephoto prime lens

EF 800mm f/5.6L IS USM
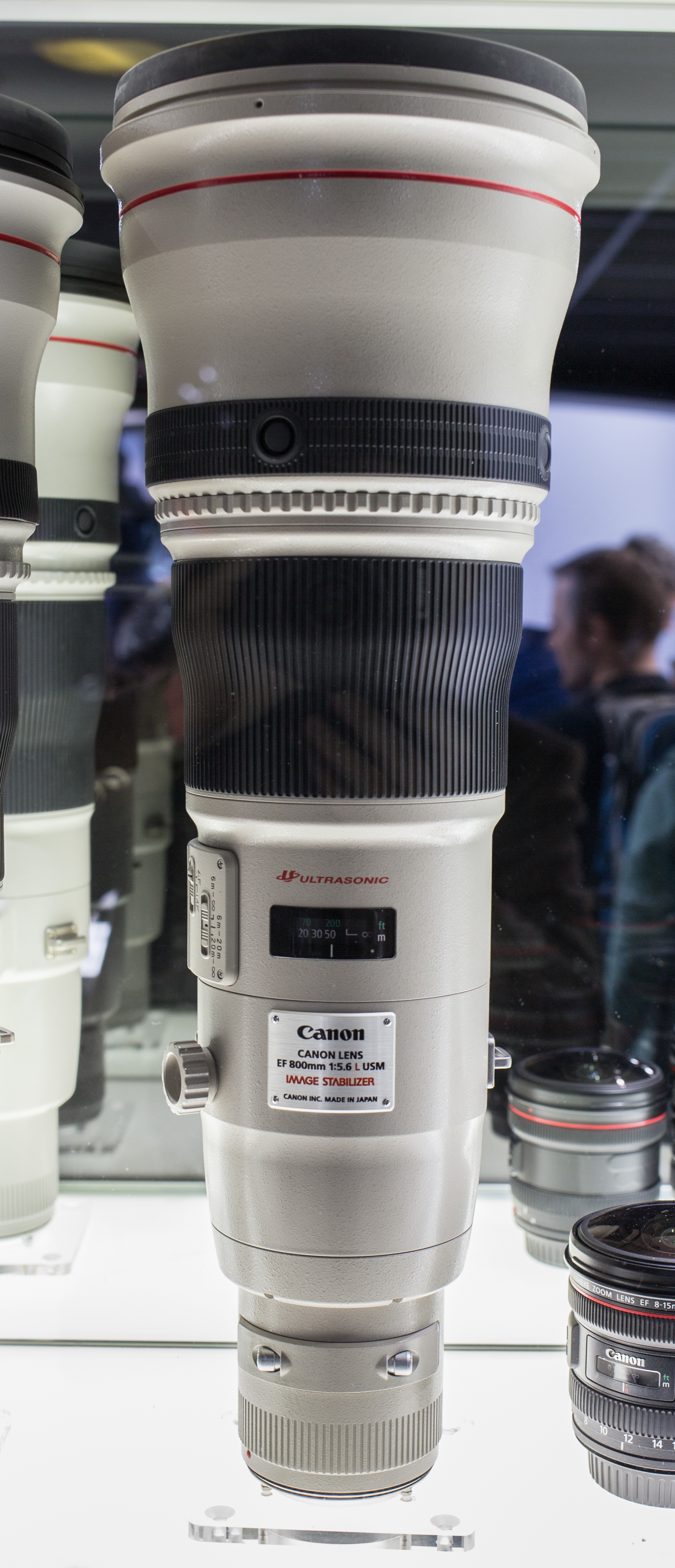
- The Canon EF 800mm f/5.6L IS USM
- Maker: Canon

Technical data
- Type: Prime
- Focus drive: Ultrasonic motor
- Focal length: 800 mm
- Aperture (max/min): f/5.6 – f/32
- Close focus distance: 19.7 ft / 6.0 m
- Max. magnification: 0.14×
- Diaphragm blades: 8
- Construction: 18 elements in 14 groups

Features
- Lens-based stabilization: Yes Yes
- Application: Super Telephoto

Physical
- Max. length: 18.2 in / 461 mm
- Diameter: 6.4 in / 162 mm
- Weight: 9.9 lbs / 4.5 kg
- Filter diameter: 52 mm drop-in

Accessories
- Lens hood: Lens Cap E-180C
- Case: Lens Case 800MM

Angle of view
- Horizontal: 2° 35'
- Vertical: 1° 40'
- Diagonal: 3° 5'

History
- Introduction: May 2008
- Discontinuation: 2021

Retail info
- MSRP: 11,999 (at release); 12,999 (May 2015) USD

The Canon EF 800mm f/5.6L IS USM lens is a super-telephoto lens by Canon Inc., released at a manufacturer's suggested retail price of US$11,999.00 and now selling at an MSRP of $12,999.00.

== Technical information ==
The EF 800mm f/5.6L IS USM is a professional L series lens released June 2008. This lens is constructed with a magnesium alloy body and mount and with plastic extremities and switches. Features of this lens are: a wide rubber focus ring that is damped, a focus distance window, the ability to limit the focus range, a focus-preset mechanism, an image stabilizer that is effective up to four stops and is tripod sensing, an AF stop switch, and weather sealing. A maximum aperture of f/5.6 gives this lens the ability to create depth of field effects. The optical construction of this lens contains two fluorite lens elements, and "Super UD" (Ultra low dispersion) and UD Lens elements. This lens uses an inner focusing system powered by a ring type USM motor. This lens is compatible with the Canon Extender EF teleconverters.
