= Canon Extender EF =

Group of teleconverter lenses made by Canon

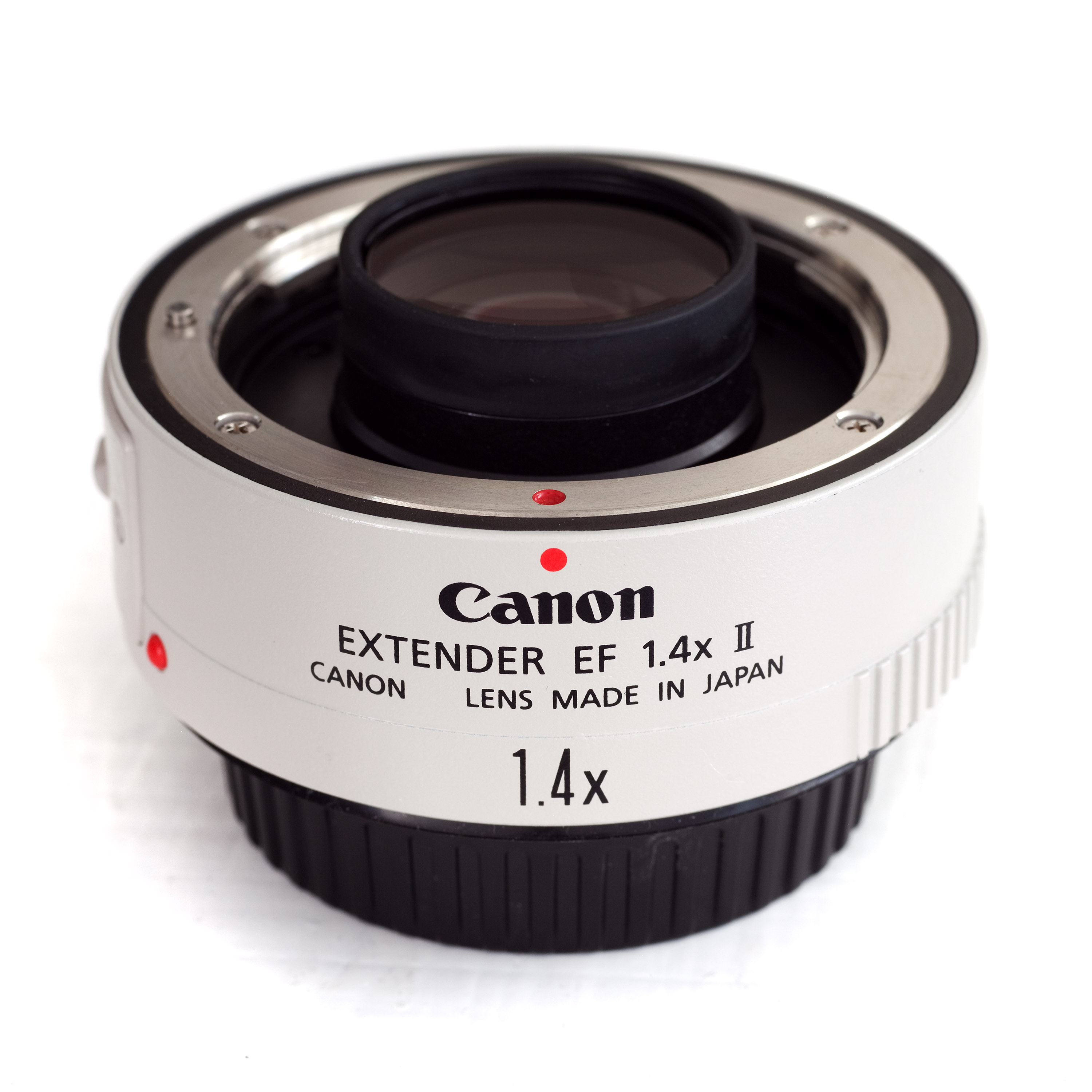
The Canon Extender EF 1.4x II

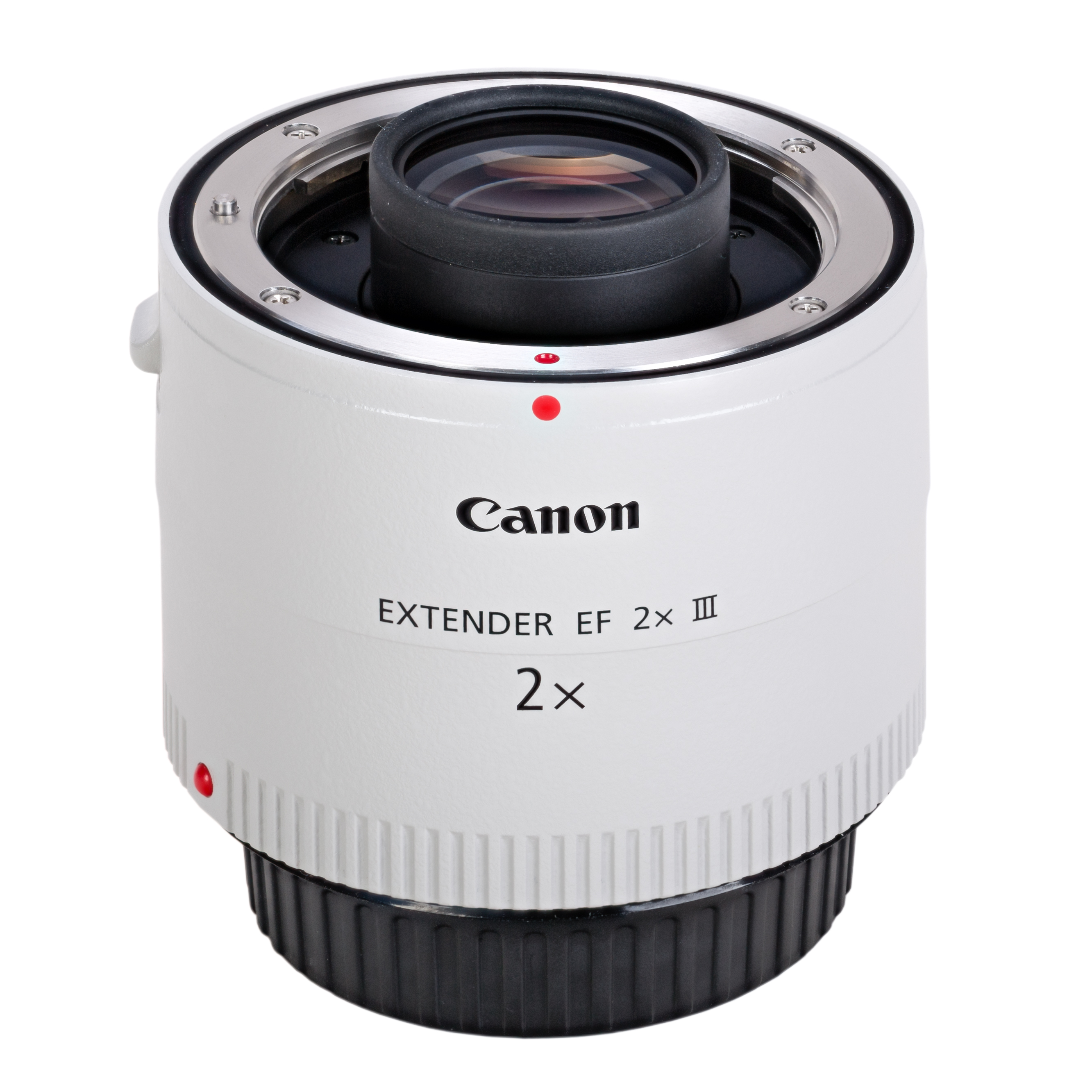
Image of the Canon 2x III Extender

The Canon Extender EF lenses are a group of teleconverter lenses made by Canon. These lenses are used between any compatible EF type lens and any of the Canon EOS line of cameras. When used with a compatible lens, they will multiply the focal length of the lens by a factor of either 1.4x or 2x, at the cost of decreasing the lens' aperture by 1 or 2 stops respectively. For example, using a 1.4x or 2x extender with the Canon EF 500mm f/4L IS USM would result in a 700mm f/5.6 or 1000mm f/8 lens.

== Overview ==
Canon has released six models:

- 1.4x (1988)
- 1.4x II (2001)
- 1.4x III (2010)
- 2x (1987)
- 2x II (2001)
- 2x III (2010)

== Technical information ==
The extenders are constructed with metal bayonets, and engineered plastic ends. There are no moving parts, other than the lens latch lock. Three generations of the extenders exist: the older 1.4× and 2×, the 1.4× II and 2× II, and the 1.4× III and 2.0× III. The II versions have weather-sealing and anti-reflective surfaces inside the extender body. The optical construction of the 1.4× versions are of a five-element design. Both 2× versions use seven elements, although the optical formula of the II version is different to improve optical performance. The III versions of the extenders have improved autofocus performance as well as increased image quality over the II, and their front and rear elements are coated with fluorine anti-smear coating to be easier to clean.

== Compatibility information ==
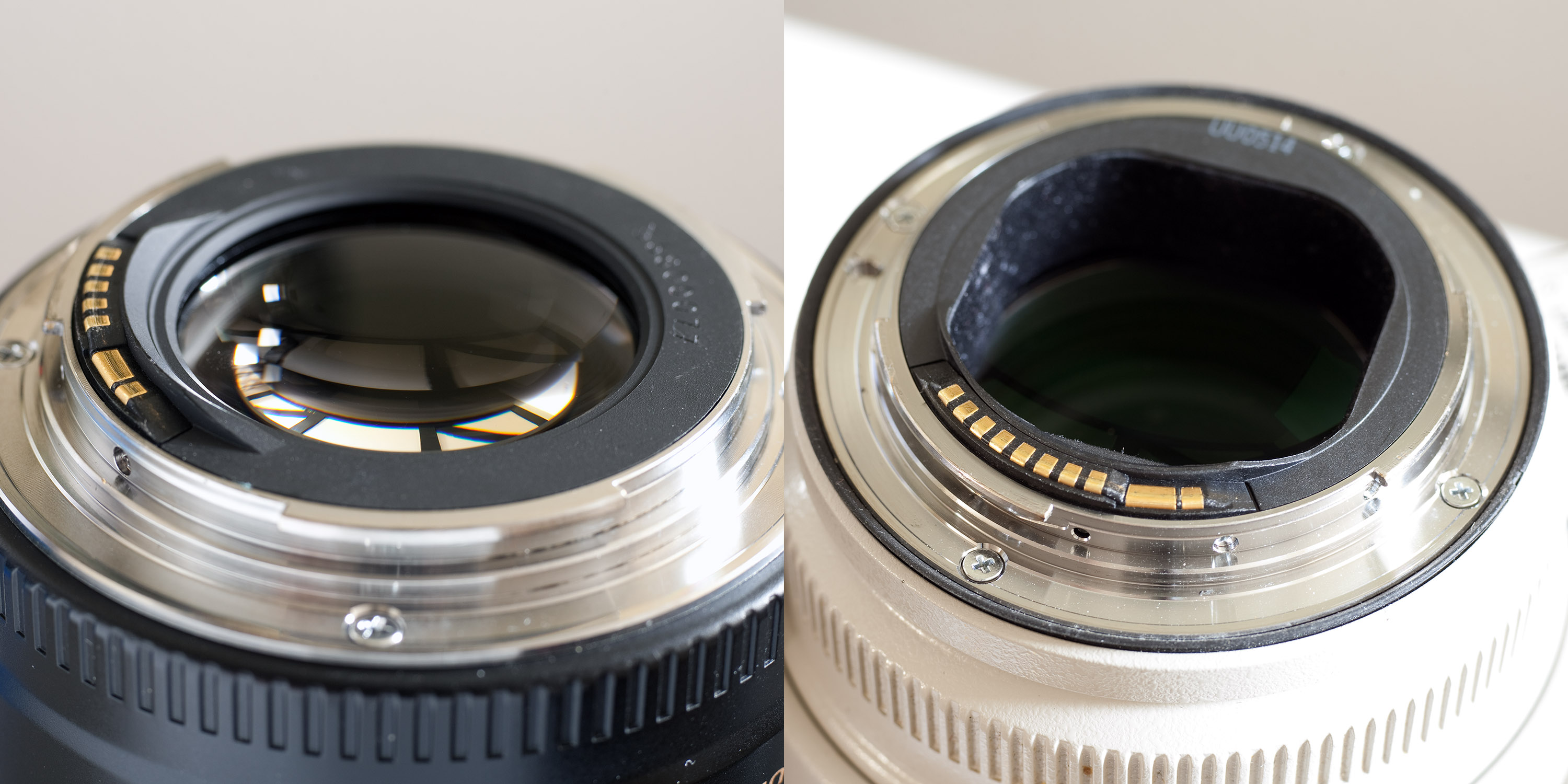
The 100 mm f/2 on the left is incompatible with Canon Extenders, unlike the 70-200mm f/2.8 IS on the right.

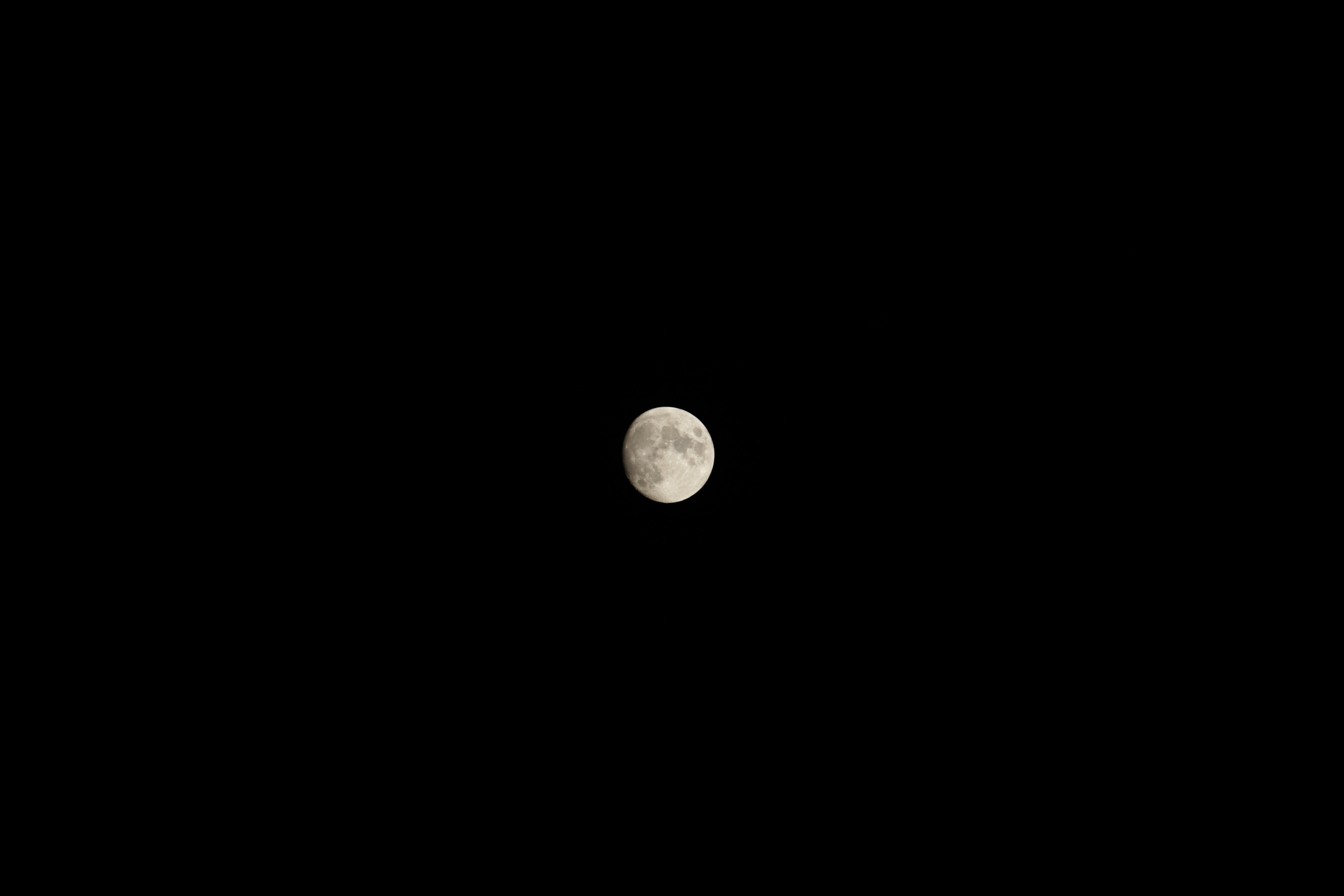
300mm f/2.8 IS lens, no extender

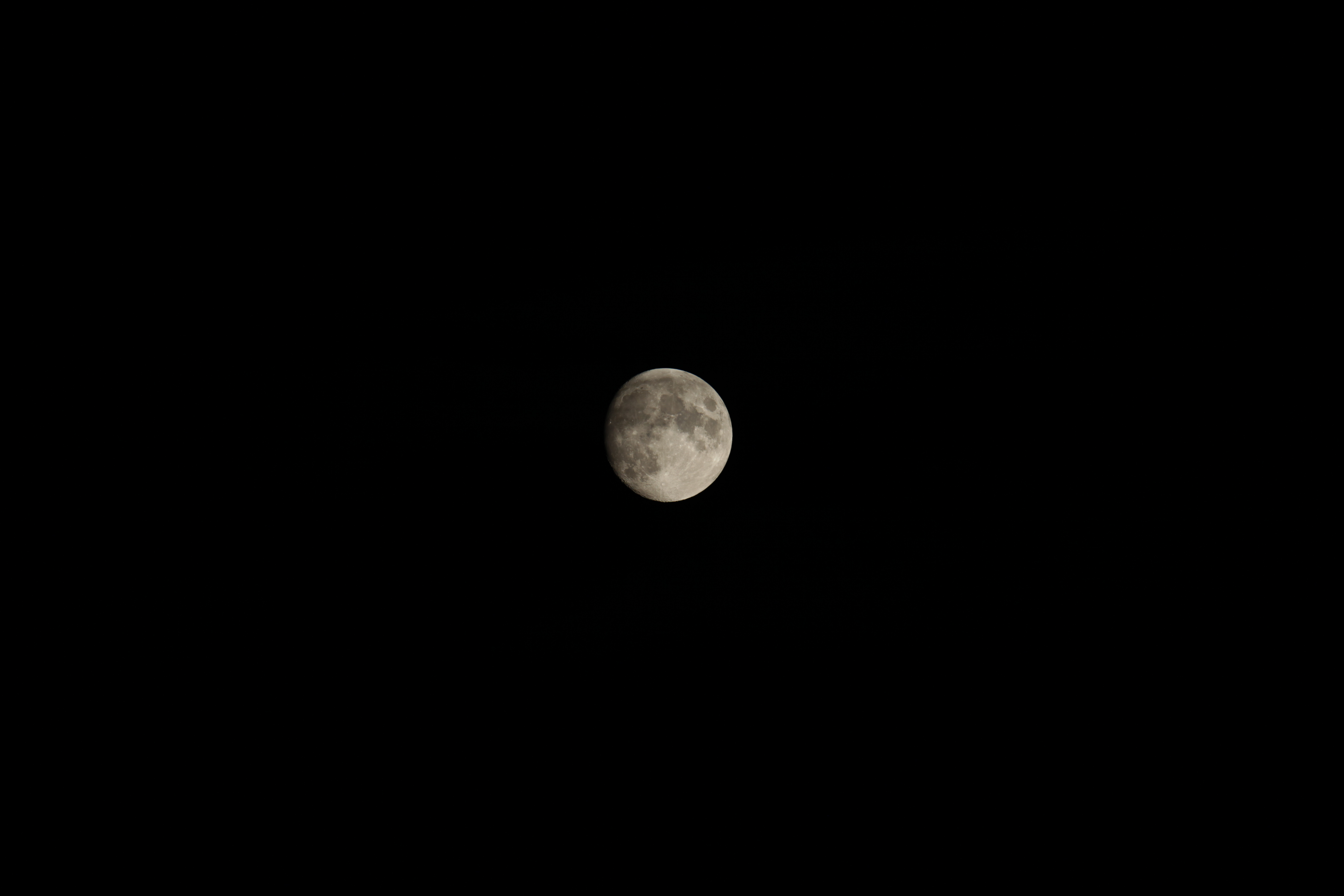
300mm f/2.8 IS lens, 1.4× extender

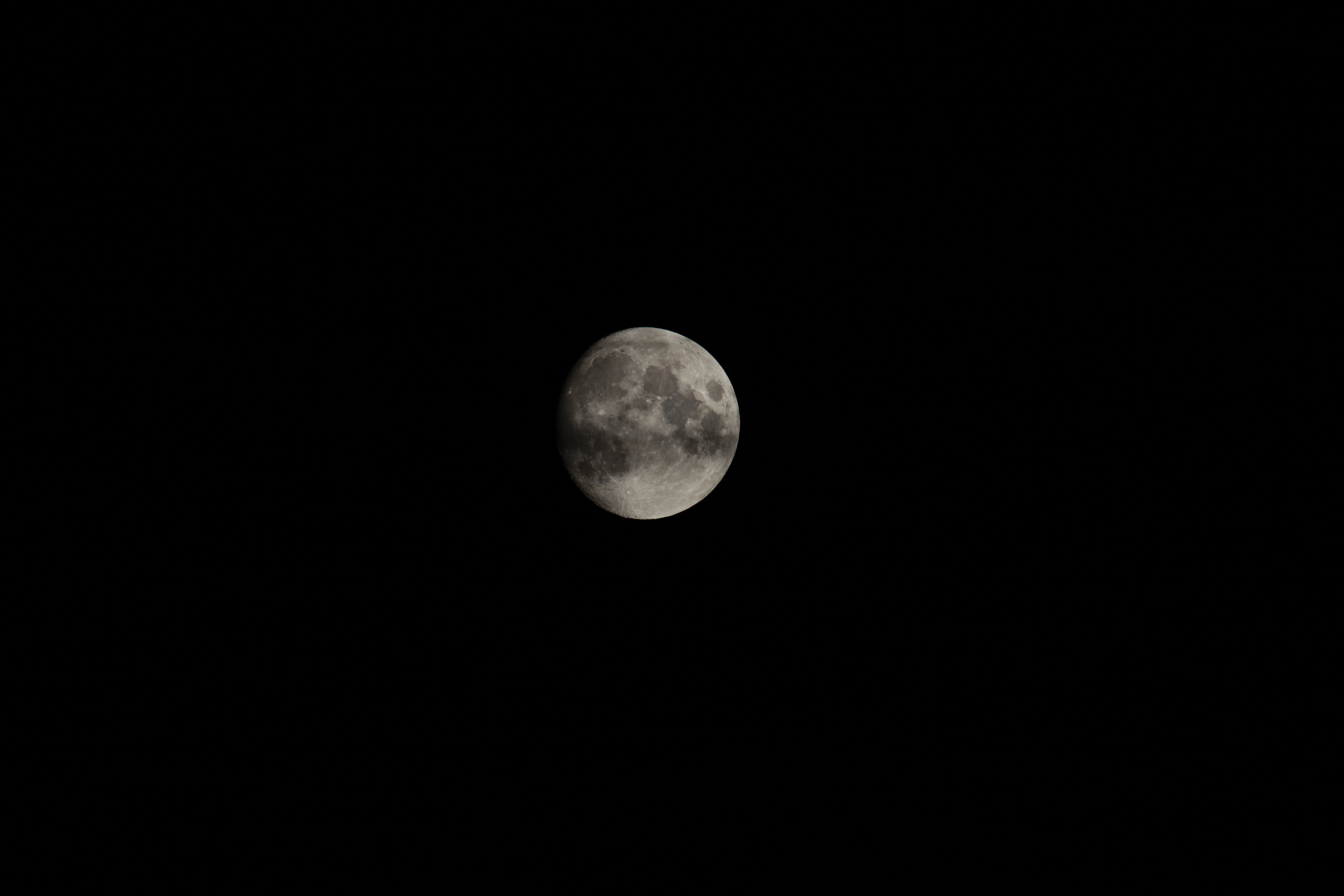
300mm f/2.8 IS lens, 2.0× extender

These Extender EF lenses can only be used with lenses that have a compatible mount. While all EF lenses have mount designs that can be used with EOS bodies, only lenses with accordant mounts can be used with the extender EF lenses. These lenses must have the clearance to accept the protruding lens on the extender, as well as 10 (3 extra) electronic contacts for proper electronic communication with the extender. These extra electronic contacts are used for sending the correct aperture information to the body.

When a compatible lens is used with a 1.4× or 2× extender, it will cost the lens a one or two stop decline in aperture size, respectively. Autofocus speed of any used EF lens is also affected. When used with the 1.4× extender, autofocus speed is reduced by 50%. When used with the 2× extender, autofocus speed is reduced by 75%. Image stabilization may not work on lenses that are equipped with an extender, or on certain EOS bodies.

Some EOS bodies are unable to autofocus when the maximum aperture of a lens is smaller than f/5.6. Professional-level bodies are capable of autofocusing lenses with a maximum aperture of f/8, but only with the centre autofocus point. With a 2× extender a 400mm f/4 lens would have an equivalent focal length of 800mm and a maximum aperture of f/8, in which case autofocus would only be available with professional bodies. With the same converter a 400mm f/5.6 lens would have a maximum aperture of f/11 and autofocus would be disabled.

Though not specified by Canon as such, users have reported that the tilt-shift lenses in Canon's line-up can also be used with the extenders. However, when used with an extender, the lens will not pass on the correct aperture to the camera. The focal length stored in the Exif data will also be incorrect.

=== List of compatible EF lenses ===
The following is a list of EF lenses that are compatible with the Extender EF lenses together with their resulting focal lengths, and apertures. Also listed is the autofocus and image stabilization functionality.

Lens	Lens with 1.4×	AF with 1.4×	IS with 1.4×	Lens with 2×	AF with 2×	IS with 2×
135 mm f/2L USM	190 mm f/2.8	Yes	—	270 mm f/4	Yes	—
180 mm f/3.5L Macro USM	252 mm f/5 (Note: The aperture is for bodies using 1/3-step displays.)	Yes (Note: Autofocus range is reduced from 0.48 m–infinity to 0.8 m–infinity.)	—	360 mm f/7.1	No	—
200 mm f/1.8L USM	280 mm f/2.5	Yes	—	400 mm f/3.5	Yes	—
200 mm f/2.0L IS USM	280 mm f/2.8	Yes	Yes	400 mm f/4	Yes	Yes
200 mm f/2.8L II USM	280 mm f/4	Yes	—	400 mm f/5.6	Yes	—
300 mm f/2.8L USM	420 mm f/4	Yes	—	600 mm f/5.6	Yes	—
300 mm f/2.8L IS USM	420 mm f/4	Yes	Yes	600 mm f/5.6	Yes	Yes
300 mm f/4L USM	420 mm f/5.6	Yes	—	600 mm f/8	(Note: Autofocus is possible using only the center AF point.)	—
300 mm f/4L IS USM	420 mm f/5.6	Yes	Yes	600 mm f/8	Maybe	Maybe
400 mm f/2.8L USM	560 mm f/4	Yes	—	800 mm f/5.6	Yes	—
400 mm f/2.8L II USM	560 mm f/4	Yes	—	800 mm f/5.6	Yes	—
400 mm f/2.8L IS USM	560 mm f/4	Yes	Yes	800 mm f/5.6	Yes	Yes
400 mm f/4 IS DO USM	560 mm f/5.6	Yes	Yes	800 mm f/8	Maybe	Maybe
400 mm f/4 DO IS II USM	560 mm f/5.6	Yes	Yes	800 mm f/8	Maybe	Maybe
400 mm f/5.6L USM	560 mm f/8	Maybe	—	800 mm f/11	No	—
500 mm f/4L IS USM	700 mm f/5.6	Yes	Yes	1000 mm f/8	Maybe	Maybe
500 mm f/4.5L USM	700 mm f/6.3	Maybe	—	1000 mm f/9.0	No	—
600 mm f/4L USM	840 mm f/5.6	Yes	—	1200 mm f/8	Maybe	—
600 mm f/4L IS USM	840 mm f/5.6	Yes	Yes	1200 mm f/8	Maybe	Maybe
800 mm f/5.6L IS USM	1120 mm f/8	Maybe	Maybe	1600 mm f/11	No	Maybe
1200 mm f/5.6L USM	1680 mm f/8	Maybe	—	2400 mm f/11	No	—
70–200 mm f/2.8L IS USM	98–280 mm f/4	Yes	Yes	140–400 mm f/5.6	Yes	Yes
70–200 mm f/2.8L IS II USM	98–280 mm f/4	Yes	Yes	140–400 mm f/5.6	Yes	Yes
70–200 mm f/2.8L USM	98–280 mm f/4	Yes	—	140–400 mm f/5.6	Yes	—
70–200 mm f/4L IS USM	98–280 mm f/5.6	Yes	Yes	140–400 mm f/8	Maybe	Maybe
70–200 mm f/4L USM	98–280 mm f/5.6	Yes	—	140–400 mm f/8	Maybe	—
100–400 mm f/4.5–5.6L IS USM	140–560 mm f/6.3–8	Maybe	Maybe	200–800 mm f/9–11	No	Maybe
100–400 mm f/4.5–5.6L IS II USM	140–560 mm f/6.3–8	Maybe	Maybe	200–800 mm f/9–11	No	Maybe
200–400 mm f/4L IS USM (without built-in extender 1.4×)	280–560 mm f/5.6	Yes	Maybe	400–800 mm f/8	Maybe	Maybe
200–400 mm f/4L IS USM (with built-in extender 1.4×)	400–800 mm f/8	Maybe	Maybe	560–1120 mm f/11	No	Maybe
TS-E 17 mm f/4L	24 mm f/5.6	No (Note: TS-E lenses are not equipped with an autofocus motor.)	—	34 mm f/8	No	—
TS-E 24 mm f/3.5L	35 mm f/5.0	No	—	50 mm f/7.1	No	—
TS-E 45 mm f/2.8	65 mm f/4.0	No	—	90 mm f/5.6	No	—
TS-E 90 mm f/2.8	125 mm f/4.0	No	—	180 mm f/5.6	No	—
Key
Autofocus:	Yes - AF works. - AF works only with EOS bodies that can AF at f/8. No - AF does not work.					
Image stabilization:	Yes - IS works. - IS works only with supported EOS bodies (generally, bodies introduced since approximately 1995).					

==== List of EOS bodies that can AF at f/8 ====
Canon EOS bodies that have a high density, high precision auto-focus sensor with 45 or more AF points are able to autofocus at maximum apertures of f/8.

- Canon EOS-1D X Mark II
- Canon EOS-1D X Mark III
- Canon EOS-1D X (with firmware version 1.1.1)
- Canon EOS 5D Mark III (with firmware version 1.2.1)
- Canon EOS 5DS
- Canon EOS 5DS R
- Canon EOS 5D Mark IV
- Canon EOS 6D Mark II
- Canon EOS 7D Mark II
- Canon EOS 80D
- Canon EOS 77D
- Canon EOS 90D
- Canon EOS 800D/Rebel T7i
- Canon EOS 850D/Rebel T8i
- Canon EOS-1D Mark IV
- Canon EOS-1Ds Mark III
- Canon EOS-1D Mark III
- Canon EOS-1Ds Mark II
- Canon EOS-1D Mark II
- Canon EOS-1D Mark II N
- Canon EOS-1Ds
- Canon EOS-1D
- Canon EOS-1V
- Canon EOS 3

==== Dual Pixel CMOS AF at f/11 ====
Canon EOS bodies that have Dual Pixel CMOS AF like the 70D and later models support autofocusing in Liveview mode, with maximum apertures as small as f/11.

== See also ==
- Kenko
- Nikon F-mount teleconverter
- Teleconverter

== Sources ==
- EF LENS WORK III DESIGN SPECIFICATIONS & LENS MAPS Archived 2008-12-30 at the Wayback Machine
