= Canon EF 1200mm lens =

Super-telephoto lens

EF 1200 mm f/5.6 L USM
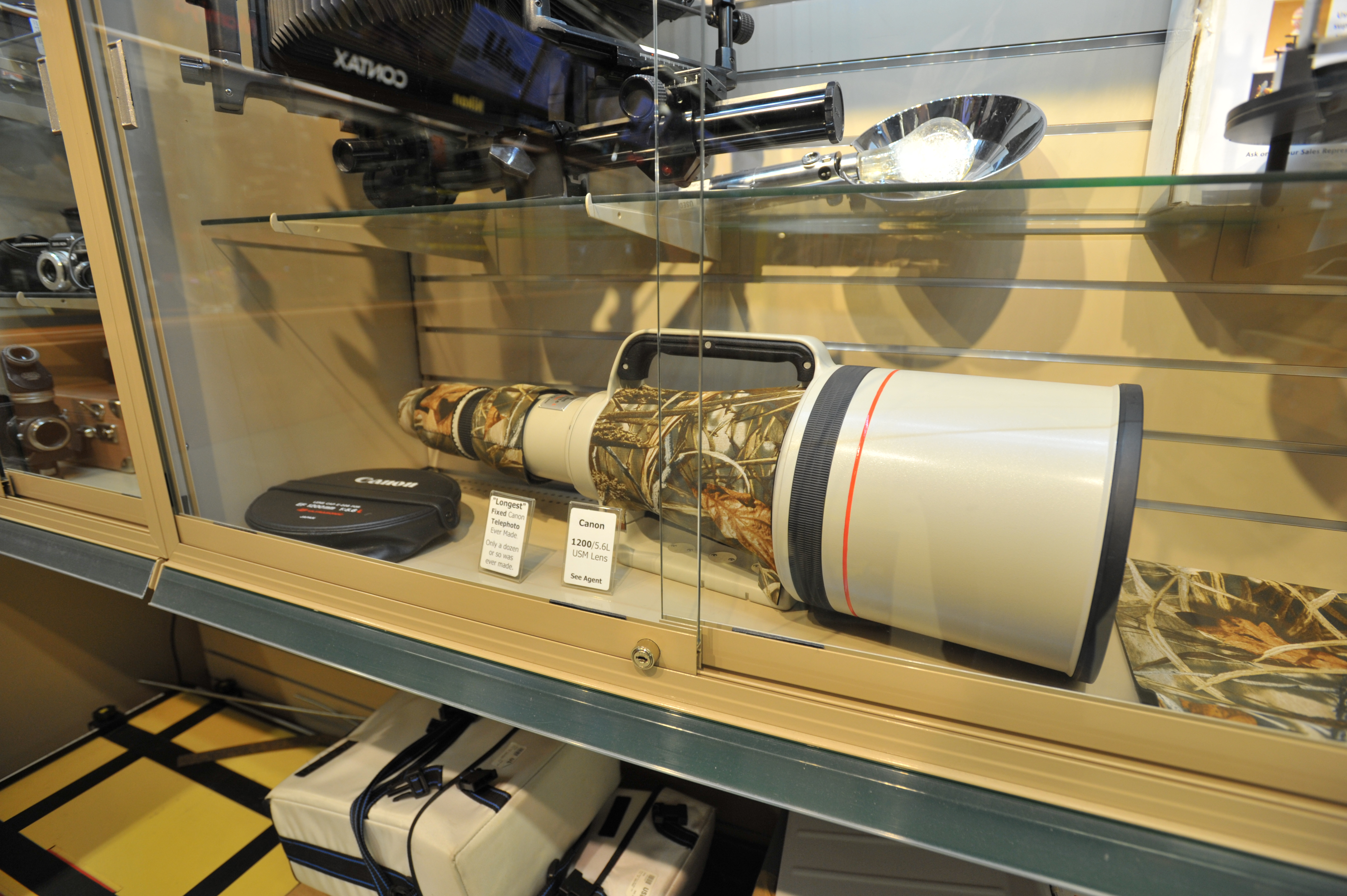
- Canon EF 1200 mm f/-5.6 L USM in a display case
- Maker: Canon

Technical data
- Type: Prime
- Focus drive: Ultrasonic motor
- Focal length: 1200 mm
- Aperture (max/min): f/5.6 - f/32
- Close focus distance: 45.9'/14 m
- Max. magnification: 1:11.1
- Diaphragm blades: 9
- Construction: 13 elements in 11 groups

Features
- Lens-based stabilization: No No
- Application: Super Telephoto

Physical
- Max. length: 32.9"/83.6 cm
- Diameter: 8.9"/22.8 cm
- Weight: 36.37 lbs/16.5 kg
- Filter diameter: 48 mm (drop-in)

Accessories
- Lens hood: Built-In
- Case: Exclusive

Angle of view
- Horizontal: 1°45'
- Vertical: 1°10'
- Diagonal: 2°05'

History
- Introduction: July 1993

Retail info
- MSRP: 89,579 USD

The EF 1200 mm f/5.6 L USM is a super-telephoto prime lens that was made by Canon Inc. It uses an EF mount, and is compatible with the Canon EOS camera range. It has a focal length of 1200 mm and so on a digital body with a sensor size of 22.5 mm × 15 mm (called 1.6× crop), such as a Canon EOS 40D or 450D, it provides a 35 mm field of view equivalent to that of a 1920 mm lens. With a body with a sensor size of 28.8 mm × 19.2 mm (called 1.3× crop), such as a Canon EOS-1D Mark IV, the field of view is equivalent to that of a 1560 mm lens.

The lens was aimed at sports and wildlife photographers, and is both extremely expensive and extremely rare. Canon described it as "the world’s largest interchangeable SLR AF lens, in terms of both focal length and maximum aperture."

== Technical information ==
The EF 1200 mm f/5.6 L USM is a professional L-series lens, that is now discontinued. The lens was first developed for the Canon FD mount, although never marketed until after Canon had transitioned to the EF mount. According to a Canon USA representative interviewed in 2009, the lens made its first public appearance at the 1984 Summer Olympics in Los Angeles; Canon had shipped five copies of the lens for media use at the Games. All of the FD 1200 mm f/5.6 L lenses were eventually shipped back to Canon in Japan. Later in the 1980s, these lenses were converted to the EF mount. When used at the Los Angeles Olympics the lenses were fitted with built-in 1.4x teleconverters. The official website of Canon competitor Nikon implies that these lenses, with the built-in 1.4x teleconverter, were also used by photographers covering baseball games, including the very popular high school tournaments, at Japan's Koshien Stadium. Nikon developed a 1200–1700mm manual-focus super telephoto zoom, specifically designed for use at that stadium, in order to compete with Canon's offering. The lens' exact discontinuation date is not documented, but lies around 2005 (see below sources). At that time, Canon habitually displayed all their telephoto lenses at fairs such as Photokina for users to try. This included the 1200mm up to 2005. At the 2006 Photokina, it was absent.

This lens is constructed with a metal body and mount, and with plastic extremities and switches. The features of the lens are: a wide rubber focus ring that is damped, a distance window with infrared index, the ability to limit the focus range, a focus-preset mechanism, and the ability to set the AF speed. The maximum aperture of f/5.6 gives this lens the ability to create depth of field effects. The optical construction of the lens contains 13 lens elements, including two large fluorite lens elements. The lens uses an inner focusing system, powered by a ring type USM motor. Manual focusing is rendered by wire: the lens does not have a direct mechanical connection to the focusing ring, instead detecting rotation of the focusing ring and using the lens motor to drive the lens elements. The manual focus speed is adjustable: 1 = 1/2 standard (for precision), 2 = standard and 3 = 2x standard (for fast-moving subjects). The front of the lens does not rotate nor extend when focusing. It does not have a typical rotating tripod mount like other telephoto lenses. However, the lens mount can be rotated and locked, allowing the lens to be used in horizontal and vertical shot formats. It is compatible with the Canon Extender EF teleconverters. The lens uses a small slot to insert filters near the base of the lens, similar to other super-tele lenses, rather than the conventional attachment at the end of the barrel.

The lens came with its own heavy-duty tripod and case. The lens was only available for special "pre orders", and was never built before selling; its annual production volume was approximately two lenses. The lens also took more than a year to construct, due to the time required to grow its massive fluorite crystals.

Few of these lenses exist; Canon has never released production figures, but it is almost certain that fewer than 100 were made, and it has been rumored that the actual number is closer to 20. A list of owners has also never been made public, but reported owners include Sports Illustrated magazine (two); Canon Professional Services (two); James Jannard, the billionaire founder of Oakley and RED Digital Cinema (two); and the National Geographic Society (at least one for its magazine). It is also widely believed that several intelligence and law enforcement agencies own this lens.

Since its discontinuation, only three second-hand copies of the lens have been offered for public sale:

- In 2009, the New York-based B&H Photo Video retailer sold this lens for US$120,000.
- In August 2014 a British dealer, MPB Photographic, offered this lens for £99,000 (slightly over $165,000 at the time) with VAT included.
- B&H offered this lens again in April 2015, this time for $180,000.
- On October 9, 2021, the German auction house Wetzlar Camera Auctions offered this lens to the public at auction, eventually selling for €400,000 (about $460,000), the highest ever value for a camera lens.
