= Canon EF 400mm lens =

Canon SLR EF mount prime lens

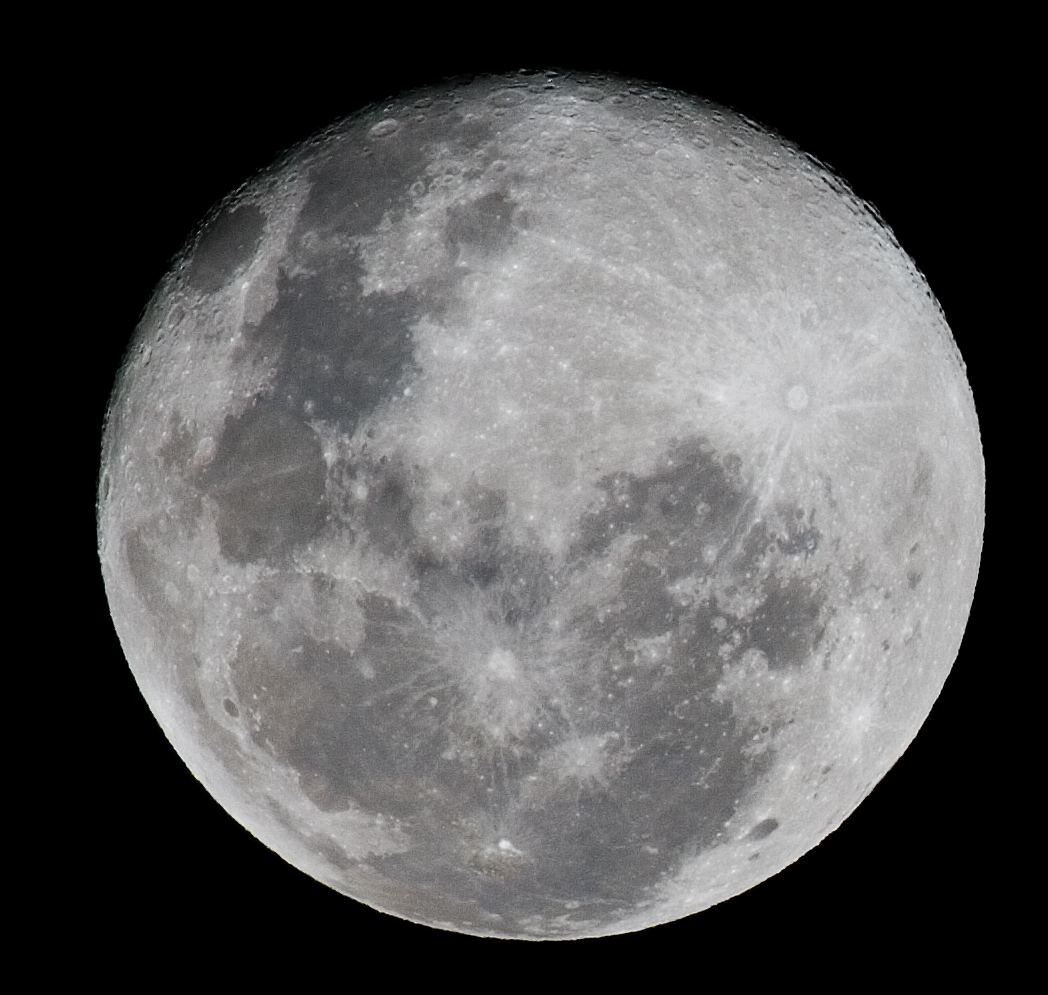
The moon as seen through the EF 400mm f/5.6L USM with a teleconverter

The Canon EF 400mm are seven super-telephoto lenses made by Canon. These lenses have an EF mount that work with the EOS line of cameras. These lenses are widely used by sports and wildlife photographers.

Canon has manufactured four 400mm prime lenses:

- EF 400mm f/2.8L IS III USM
- EF 400mm f/2.8L IS II USM
- EF 400mm f/4 DO IS II USM
- EF 400mm f/5.6L USM

The 400mm f/4 DO IS II USM, which replaced an earlier version of the same lens in 2014, is one of only two Canon lenses that make use of diffractive optics (the other is the EF 70–300mm f/4.5–5.6 DO IS USM). The use of diffractive optics allows the lens to be significantly lighter than it might otherwise be.

These lenses are compatible with the Canon Extender EF teleconverters.

== Specifications of the EF 400mm lenses ==
Attribute	f/2.8L USM	f/2.8L II USM	f/2.8L IS USM	f/2.8L IS II USM	f/2.8L IS III USM	f/4 DO IS USM	f/4 DO IS II USM	f/5.6L USM
Image								
Key features
Full-frame compatible	Yes Yes							
Image stabilizer	No No		Yes Yes					No No
Ultrasonic Motor	Yes Yes							
L-series	Yes Yes					No No		Yes Yes
Diffractive Optics	No No					Yes Yes		No No
Macro	No No							
Technical data
Aperture (max-min)	f/2.8-f/32					f/4-f/32		f/5.6-f/32
Construction	9 groups / 11 elements		13 groups / 17 elements	12 groups / 16 elements	13 groups / 17 elements		12 groups / 18 elements	6 groups / 7 elements
# of diaphragm blades	8			9		8	9	8
Closest focusing distance	4 meters (13.1 ft)		3 m (9.8 ft)	2.7 m (8.9 ft)	2.5 m (8.2 ft)	3.5 m (11.5 ft)	3.3 m (10.8 ft)	3.5 m (11.5 ft)
Max. magnification	0.11×		0.15×	0.17×		0.12×	0.13×	0.11×
Horizontal viewing angle	5°10'							
Vertical viewing angle	3°30'							
Diagonal viewing angle	6°10'							
Physical data
Weight	13.44 lb / 6.1 kg	13.03 lb / 5.91 kg	11.83 lb / 5.37 kg	8.48 lb / 3.85 kg	6.26 lb / 2.84 kg	4.27 lb / 1.94 kg	4.63 lb / 2.10 kg	2.8 lb / 1.25 kg
Maximum diameter	6.57" / 167mm		6.41" / 163mm			5.03" / 128mm	5.04" / 128mm	3.54" / 90mm
Length	13.70" / 348mm		13.74" / 349mm	13.50" / 343mm		9.16" / 232.7mm	9.18" / 232.7mm	10.09" / 256.5mm
Filter diameter	48mm		52mm drop-in filter					77mm
Accessories
Lens hood	ET-161B II		ET-155	ET-155 (WII)		ET-120	ET-120 (WII)	Built-in
Case			400	400C	400E	400B	400D	LH-D29
Retail information
Release date	April 1991	March 1996	September 1999	August 2011	December 2018	December 2001	September 2014	May 1993
Currently in production?	No No			Yes Yes	Yes Yes	No No	No No	No No
MSRP $	870,000 yen	980,000 yen	$7,999	$9,999	$11,999	$6,469	$6,899	$1,249

== Use in astronomy ==
Canon 400 mm f/2.8 L IS II USM lenses are used in the Dragonfly Telephoto Array. The array is designed to image astronomical objects with low surface brightness such as some satellite galaxies. The array started with three lenses but this has since increased to 24 with plans for 50. By march 2026 it had 48.

A second project also using Canon 400 mm f/2.8 lenses known as the Massive Optical Telephoto Hyperspectral Robotic Array plans to use 1,140 lenses. Work started on it at the beginning of 2025 with an aimed completion date of the end of 2026.
