= Canon EF 200-400mm lens =

Zoom lens with build in Teleconverter

The EF 200–400 mm f/4L IS USM Extender 1.4× is an EF mount super telephoto zoom lens produced by Canon. It is part of the professional L-series and functions with the Canon EOS line of cameras. The EF 200–400 mm lens features an ultrasonic motor, image stabilization and weather sealing. It is the first and only EF lens with a built-in extender.

== History ==
The EF 200–400 mm f/4L was first announced to be in development in February 2011 and a prototype was showcased at the 2011 CP+ tradeshow. In November 2011, Canon announced that availability of the lens would be postponed to an unspecified later date. The lens was only released more than a year later in May 2013.

== Built-in 1.4× Extender ==
Although not the first lens to be equipped with a built-in teleconverter, an honor that belongs to the older Canon FD mount 1200 mm f/5.6L 1.4× lens, the EF 200–400 is the first to be for the EF mount, and the first to enter mass production. The extender, when engaged, increases the lens' focal length by a factor of 1.4×, while decreasing the aperture by a single stop, changing the lens to a 280–560 mm f/5.6 lens. The extender is activated and deactivated by a mechanical switch close to the lens mount.

== Specifications ==
Attribute	f/4L IS USM Extender 1.4×
Image	
Key features
Image stabilizer	Yes (4 stops)
Environmental Sealing	Yes
Ultrasonic Motor	Yes
L-series	Yes
Diffractive Optics	No
Macro	No
Built in 1.4× Extender	Yes
Technical data
Maximum aperture	f/4 (f/5.6 with extender)
Minimum aperture	f/32 (f/45 with extender)
Horizontal viewing angle	10°–5°10' (7°20'–3°40' with extender)
Vertical viewing angle	7°–3°30' (4°55'–2°25' with extender)
Diagonal viewing angle	12°–6°10' (8°50'–4°25' with extender)
Groups/elements	20/25 (24/33 with extender)
# of diaphragm blades	9
Closest focusing distance	2.0 m (6.6 ft)
Maximum Magnification	0.15× (0.21× with extender)
Physical data
Weight	3,620 g (7.98 lb)
Maximum diameter	128 mm (5.0 in)
Length	366 mm (14.4 in)
Filter diameter	52 mm drop in
Accessories
Lens hood	ET-120 (WII)
Lens Cap	E-145C
Case	200–400
Retail information
Release date	May 2013
MSRP (US$)	$10999.00

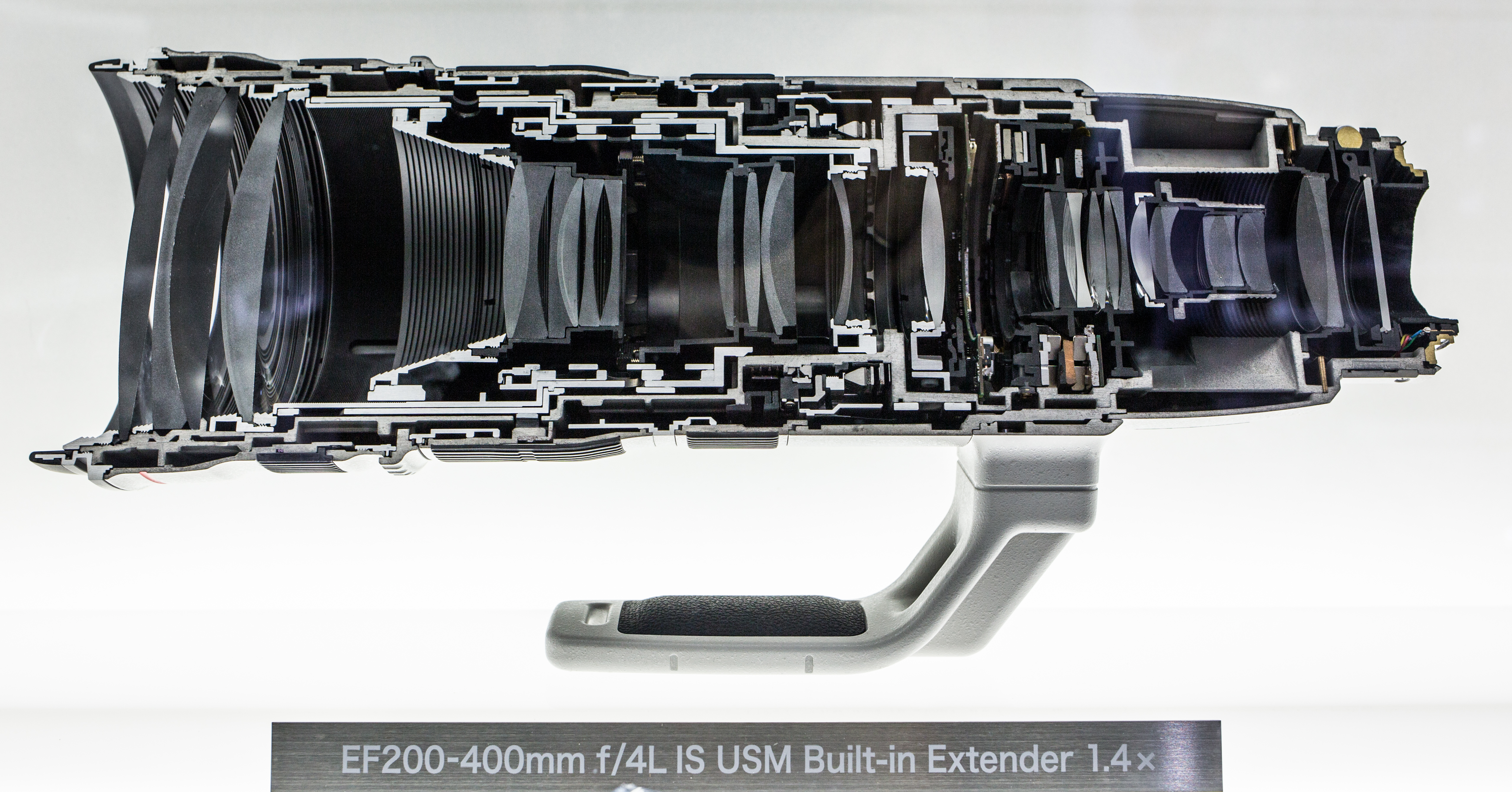
Canon EF 200-400mm f/4L IS USM Extender 1.4x lens inside

== See also ==
- Sigma 200–500mm f/2.8 EX DG lens
