= Canon EF 300mm lens =

35 mm camera lens

The EF 300mm lens refers to a family of telephoto prime lenses made by Canon, five of which have been sold to the general public and one of which was only made on special order. The lenses have an EF type mount which fits the Canon EOS line of cameras.

When used on a digital EOS body with a field of view compensation factor of 1.3x, such as the Canon EOS-1D Mark IV, it provides a narrow field of view, equivalent to a 390 mm lens mounted on a 35mm frame body. With a 1.6x body such as the Canon EOS 650D, it provides a narrower field of view, equivalent to a 480 mm lens mounted on a 35mm frame body.

This lens is most commonly used by sports and wildlife photographers, but is short enough to be use for extreme close-up portraits. Because of its rather high native magnification, it can be used for some macro type photography.

== Technical information ==
The EF 300mm is a L series lens. This lens is constructed with a metal body and mount, and with plastic extremities and switches. Features of this lens are: a wide rubber focus ring that is dampened, a distance window, the ability to limit the focus range, and an image stabilizer (on the IS versions). The maximum aperture of f/2.8 or f/4 gives this lens the ability to create shallow depth of field effects, while the eight- or nine-blade diaphragm produces smooth background blur. The optical construction of this lens contains 15 lens elements, including two UD (Ultra low dispersion) lens elements for the f4 IS USM (for other configurations see chart). This lens uses an inner focusing system, powered by a ring type USM motor. The front of the lens does not rotate nor extend when focusing. This lens is compatible with the Canon Extender EF teleconverters.

== Specifications ==
Attribute	f/2.8L USM	f/2.8L IS USM	f/2.8L IS II USM	f/4L USM	f/4L IS USM
Image					
Key features
Full-frame compatible	Yes Yes				
Image stabilizer	No No	Yes Yes	Yes Yes	No No	Yes Yes
Ring USM	Yes Yes				
L-series	Yes Yes				
Diffractive Optics	No No				
Macro	No No				
Technical data
Aperture (max-min)	f/2.8-f/32			f/4-f/32	
Construction	8 groups / 10 elements	13 groups / 17 elements	12 groups / 16 elements	7 groups / 8 elements	11 groups / 15 elements
# of diaphragm blades	8		9	8	
Closest focusing distance	3 m	2.5 m	2 m	2.5 m	1.5 m
Max. magnification	0.11×	0.13×	0.18×	0.13×	0.24×
Horizontal viewing angle	6° 50'				
Vertical viewing angle	4° 35'				
Diagonal viewing angle	8° 15'				
Physical data
Weight	2.855 kg	2.550 kg	2.400 kg	1.165 kg	1.190 kg
Maximum diameter	128 mm			90 mm	
Length	252 mm		248 mm	221 mm	
Filter diameter	48 mm drop-in	52 mm drop-in		77 mm	
Retail information
Release date	November 1987	July 1999	August 2010	December 1991	March 1997
Currently in production?	No No		No No	No No	No No
MSRP $	$3,499	$4,879	$6,099	$1,199	$1,349

== The 300mm f/1.8 ==
In addition to the above lenses, Canon made an even faster lens, the EF PE 300mm f/1.8, specifically for photo finishes in horse races. According to one racing photographer, Canon made only four of these lenses, making it even less common than the famously rare EF 1200mm lens. Not only is this lens exceptionally rare, very little information about it is available online; the company's online Canon Camera Museum does not list this lens.
