= EffectsLab Pro =

Visual effects software

FXhome EffectsLab
- Developer: FXhome
- Stable release: 1.005.012 / 14 July 2008
- Operating system: Microsoft Windows and Mac OS
- Type: Visual Effects
- License: Proprietary
- Website: fxhome.com/effectslab/

EffectsLab Pro is a discontinued visual effects software product developed by FXhome. It has since been superseded by the FXhome HitFilm range.

The company also produced a limited functionality version, EffectsLab Lite, containing just the Particle engine. A more extensive product, VisionLab Studio, combined the functionality of EffectsLab Pro and the company's CompositeLab Pro product with enhancements to both.

== Effects Engines ==
The effects are generated by the program's effect engines:

- The Neon Light engine allows light beams to be drawn onto the video, allowing the generation of lightsaber-like weapons, neon lighting, fantasy glow effects and laser blasts.
- The Particle engine is used for particle effects, such as smoke, fire, explosions, and weather effects.
- The Muzzle Flash engine is designed for creating and animating muzzle flashes such as machine gun firing, tank blasts, etc. It's possible to rotate the created muzzle flash in 3D, making it the only engine with 3D use.
- The Optics engine is designed for creating artificial lens flares and light sources. It is useful for enhancing other light-based effects, and mimicking the distinctive flashes of light that accompany Star Wars' lightsaber battles.
- The Laser engine (introduced in EffectsLab Pro in late 2007) is designed as a simplified method of creating laser weapon effects, including the ability to add simulated perspective to the effect.

== Presets ==
EffectsLab Pro allows the user to save the effects using presets. Since all effects are generated from settings in the different engines, it is fairly easy to generate an XML style description of the effect. It is also possible to share presets on FXhome's website.
