= List of Infinite Stratos episodes =

Cover of the first DVD/Blu-ray volume of Infinite Stratos as released by Media Factory on March 30, 2011

Infinite Stratos is an anime series adapted from the light novels of the same title written by author Izuru Yumizuru and illustrator Okiura published by Media Factory. The anime is produced by Eight Bit, directed by Yasuhito Kikuchi, series composition by Fumihiko Shimo, character design by Tomoyasu Kurashima, art directed by Shunichiro Yoshihara and sound directed by Masafumi Mima and Toshihiko Nakajima. Set in the near future, a powered exoskeleton called "Infinite Stratos" (IS), which possesses advanced technology and combat capabilities, changes the world including a major effect on society, as only women can pilot IS. The story focuses on Ichika Orimura, discovered to be the first ever male IS pilot. He is enrolled to the prestigious Infinite Stratos Academy, an international academy where IS pilots from all over the world are trained. There he meets Houki Shinonono, who is his childhood friend and younger sister of the creator of the IS. Along with other IS students from different nations, Ichika and Houki's busy school life begins. The anime follows the first three volumes of the light novels.

The first season aired in Japan from January 7 to April 1, 2011, on TBS, with subsequent runs on Chubu-Nippon Broadcasting, Sun Television, Kyoto Broadcasting System and BS-i. The series is licensed in North America by Sentai Filmworks, with Anime Network simulcasting the series on their video website. Six DVD and Blu-ray volumes will be released by Media Factory between March 30 and September 21, 2011. An original video animation, entitled IS <Infinite Stratos> Encore: A Sextet Yearns to Be in Love (IS＜インフィニット・ストラトス＞アンコール 『恋に焦がれる六重奏』, IS <Infinitto Sutoratosu> Ankōru: Koi ni Kogareru Rokujūsō), was released in Japan on DVD and Blu-ray on December 7, 2011.

The opening theme for the first season is "Straight Jet", performed by Minami Kuribayashi. The ending theme song is "Super∞Stream", with the first episode version sung by Yōko Hikasa, the second and third episode version sung by Hikasa and Yukana, the fourth and fifth episode version sung by Hikasa, Yukana and Asami Shimoda, the sixth and seventh episode version sung by Hikasa, Yukana, Shimoda and Kana Hanazawa and the final version for the rest of episodes sung by Hikasa, Yukana, Shimoda, Hanazawa and Marina Inoue. Each version of the song reflects the voice actresses' character who is running with Ichika in the episode's ending credits.

The second season aired in Japan from October 4 to December 20, 2013, on TBS, with subsequent runs on Chubu-Nippon Broadcasting, Sun Television, Kyoto Broadcasting System and BS-i. The opening theme, "True Blue Traveler", is once again performed by Minami Kuribayashi and the ending theme is "Beautiful Sky" by Yōko Hikasa.

== Episode list ==
=== Infinite Stratos (2011) ===
No. overall	No. in season	Title	Original air date
1	1	"All My Classmates are Girls"; Transliteration: "Kurasumeito wa Zen'in Onna" (Japanese: クラスメイトは全員女)	January 7, 2011
Ichika Orimura begins to attend the Infinite Stratos (IS) Academy. As the only male in the world to pilot an IS, he becomes an instant sensation among the all-female students of the academy. With his homeroom teacher being his older sister and champion IS pilot Chifuyu Orimura, assisted by substitute instructor Maya Yamada, Ichika is uneasy and unprepared as he tries to get used to the academy. He later learns that his dorm roommate is his childhood friend, kendo champion Houki Shinonono, whom he has not seen in six years. When his class decides to elect him as their class representative, Cecilia Alcott, a British IS pilot, objects and challenges him to a duel for the position.
2	2	"Class Representative Selection Match!"; Transliteration: "Kurasu Daihyō Ketteisen!" (Japanese: クラス代表決定戦!)	January 14, 2011
Chifuyu tells Ichika that he will be provided with his own personal IS for his match against Cecilia, a rarity since only 467 IS Cores were created by Tabane Shinonono, Houki's older sister, before she disappeared. To prepare, Houki agrees to train Ichika by practicing kendo brutally. On the day of the match, Ichika is given the Byakushiki to fight against Cecilia in her own personal unit, the Blue Tears. At first, Cecilia has the advantage due to her sniper abilities. But Ichika eventually manages to transform his IS into First Shift, pulling out his energy sword. However, using the energy sword quickly depletes his shield energy, and it runs out just as Ichika is about to land a strike on Cecilia. The match is declared over with Cecilia as the winner. After losing, Ichika agrees to train more with Houki. On the other hand, even though she technically won, Cecilia becomes unsure of herself.
3	3	"The Transfer Student is the Second Childhood Friend"; Transliteration: "Tenkōsei wa Sekando Osananajimi" (Japanese: 転校生はセカンド幼なじみ)	January 21, 2011
Cecilia takes a liking to Ichika and gives the position of class representative to him instead as an apology for acting childish in the two previous episodes, much to Houki's dismay. The next day, Ichika meets Lingyin Huang, the new transfer student from China who also happens to be his childhood friend as well as the class representative of her class. After Ichika and Lingyin get reacquainted with each other, Houki and Cecilia get jealous. Upon learning that Houki is Ichika's roommate, Lingyin tries to get Houki to let her become his roommate instead, to which Houki refuses. Lingyin later leaves in anger after Ichika fails to figure out the childhood promise that they had made in the past, as she wants to settle it in a class league match of the IS tournament. With his match against Lingyin with her Shenlong soon approaching, Ichika prepares himself.
4	4	"The Class League Match"; Transliteration: "Kessen! Kurasu Rīgu Matchi" (Japanese: 決戦! クラス対抗戦(リーグマッチ))	January 28, 2011
Ichika and Lingyin battle in the class league match, but they are interrupted when a mysterious IS attacks the arena. As Ichika and Lingyin hold off the IS so the audience can escape, they soon realize that the IS is an unmanned drone called a Golem due to its mechanical behavior. Together with Cecilia, the three of them manage to defeat the Golem, but not before it injures Ichika. As Ichika recovers while Lingyin watches over him, Ichika wonders if the promise that he made with Lingyin had a different meaning, in which the latter quickly denies. Meanwhile, Chifuyu and Maya examine the defeated Golem and confirm that it is an unmanned drone with a unique IS Core apart from the other 467 IS Cores that the world actually has, leading them to question who would make such a thing.
5	5	"Boy Meets Boy"; Transliteration: "Bōi Mītsu Bōi" (Japanese: ボーイ・ミーツ・ボーイ)	February 4, 2011
Ichika acts dense when Houki is allowed the chance to have her own room. As she leaves in anger, she makes him promise to go out with her should she win the next tournament, which then spreads into a rumor that the winner of the tournament would score a date with Ichika. At the same time, Charles Dunois, a supposedly male IS pilot from France, arrives and becomes Ichika's new roommate. During a training session, Chifuyu has Cecilia and Lingyin battle against Maya in the Rafale Revive Basic, though Cecilia and Lingyin are easily defeated despite them piloting the more advanced models. During lunch, as the girls share their food with Ichika, he declares that Houki's food tastes the best, much to the dismay of Cecilia and Lingyin. The next day, the entire class gets taken aback when Laura Bodewig, who is a transfer student from Germany and an acquaintance of Chifuyu, arrives. Laura immediately walks up to Ichika and slaps him hard, saying that she is unable to accept him as Chifuyu's brother.
6	6	"My Roommate is a Young, Blonde Nobleman"; Transliteration: "Rūmumeito wa Burondo Jentoru" (Japanese: ルームメイトはブロンド貴公子(ジェントル))	February 11, 2011
As Ichika has a training session with Charles in the Rafale Revive Custom II, the former declines a fight challenged by Laura. On his way to his dorm room, Ichika spots Chifuyu refusing to comply with Laura, who begs Chifuyu to return to Germany and says that the academy is not suitable for her teaching status. It is revealed that when Ichika got kidnapped during the Second Mondo Grosso of the IS championship, Chifuyu forfeited the finals to rescue her brother. Ichika later walks in on Charles in the shower, discovering that Charles is actually a girl. Charles explains that her family corporation had entered a financial crisis due to the demand for the third generation models, and she was ordered to act as a boy to give the company publicity and eventually steal data from these models. Ichika decides to keep this a secret on behalf of her safety due to the diplomatic immunity of the academy if Charles stays for a few more years. Meanwhile, Laura, who blames Ichika for blemishing his sister's record, removes her eyepatch to display her golden left eye as she swears revenge on him.
7	7	"Blue Days ~ Red Switch"; Transliteration: "Burū Deizu/Reddo Suitchi" (Japanese: ブルー・デイズ/レッド・スイッチ)	February 18, 2011
Houki becomes pressured to win the upcoming tournament after her attempt to ask Ichika out has escalated into a rumor that whoever wins the tournament would score a date with him. As Cecilia and Lingyin prepare to spar, Laura appears in the Schwarzer Regen and goads them into a two-on-one battle, effortlessly countering all their attacks. When she continues to beat the two at the risk of their lives, Ichika and Charles step in to the rescue before Chifuyu reveals that the duel will be settled in another tournament. It is soon announced that the tournament will be conducted in pairs, with Ichika choosing Charles as his partner. On the day of the tournament, it is decided via lottery that Houki is to be paired up with Laura in a class league match against Ichika and Charles.
8	8	"Find Out My Mind"; Transliteration: "Faindo Auto Mai Maindo" (Japanese: ファインド・アウト・マイ・マインド)	February 25, 2011
Laura focuses on fighting Ichika while she tosses aside Houki, who is then disabled by Charles. Ichika and Charles then take advantage of lowering Laura's shield energy to defeat her, despite Ichika depleting all of his. With her defeat imminent, Laura reminisces her past of being a failed genetically engineered soldier, until her first meeting with Chifuyu. However, Laura resents Ichika upon learning that Chifuyu has shown her softer side because of him. As a result of not wanting to lose, her unit's dormant VT system kicks in, causing her to go berserk and transform into a dark IS. Charles transfers her remaining shield energy to Ichika, allowing him to manifest his energy sword. He strikes the dark IS and frees Laura. After Laura recovers, Chifuyu explains what caused her IS to go berserk, then consoles her to choose her own path. Despite the tournament being canceled, Ichika decides to date Houki. Later at the newly opened male public bath, Charles tells Ichika that she will stay at the academy under her true name, Charlotte Dunois. When the class learns the truth about Charlotte, an angry Lingyin arrives to punish Ichika. However, Laura intervenes and kisses Ichika in front of the class, declaring him as her bride, which leaves everyone else in shock.
9	9	"Ocean's Eleven!"; Transliteration: "Ōshanzu Irebun!" (Japanese: 海に着いたら十一時(オーシャンズ・イレブン)!)	March 4, 2011
Houki calls her sister Tabane, who reveals she has completed a personal IS called the Akatsubaki just for her. After being grappled by Laura (who snuck into his room during the night) and beaten up by Houki, Ichika goes with Charlotte to the mall to buy swimsuits for the upcoming beach study session while Cecilia, Lingyin and Laura stalk them. When Charlotte notices them following her, she hides with Ichika in the dressing room to show off her swimsuit, but they are eventually discovered by Chifuyu and Maya instead. During the beach study session, each of the girls tries to get close with Ichika, but their efforts somehow backfire. The students and staff then enjoy a game of beach volleyball. As sunset arrives, Chifuyu talks with Houki about Tabane and believes her sister will come with the Akatsubaki on the seventh day of July.
10	10	"Thin Red Line"; Transliteration: "Shin Reddo Rain" (Japanese: その境界線の上に立ち(シン・レッド・ライン))	March 11, 2011
After catching the girls listening at their room while Ichika is massaging her, Chifuyu has a pep talk with the girls about their feelings for her brother and gives them some advice. The next day, Tabane arrives in person to deliver the Akatsubaki, a fourth generation model with abilities far more advanced than the other models, and Houki gives it a test run. However, Chifuyu soon receives news from Maya that an unmanned IS developed by the United States and Israel called the Silver Gospel has gone out of control. After assessing the situation, Chifuyu orders the group to stop it, while Ichika and Houki will pursue it; as the only two people with fourth generation models, they would be fast enough to catch up with the Silver Gospel.
11	11	"Get Ready"; Transliteration: "Getto Redi" (Japanese: ゲット・レディ)	March 25, 2011 (Note: Episode 11 was delayed due to 2011 Tōhoku earthquake and tsunami.)
As Ichika and Houki begin their operation, the others notice how happy Houki looks, which prompts Chifuyu to tell Ichika to watch over her carefully. As Ichika and Houki engage in battle with the Silver Gospel and are about to corner it, Ichika notices an illegal fishing ship in the area and breaks off formation to protect it. Houki is angry at Ichika for ruining the plan, but he scolds her for disregarding the safety of the ship, which is something she never does. However, the Silver Gospel launches a surprise attack on them, which forces Ichika to protect Houki by shielding her with himself. In the chaos, Houki's hair ribbon gets completely burnt. As the critically injured Ichika is admitted, Houki blames herself on what happened and wants to quit being an IS pilot. Cecilia, Lingyin, Charlotte and Laura manage to convince her otherwise. Together, they ignore Chifuyu's orders to stand by and go after the Silver Gospel themselves.
12	12	"Your Name Is"; Transliteration: "Yua Nēmu Izu" (Japanese: 君の名は(ユア・ネーム・イズ))	April 1, 2011
As the girls fight the Silver Gospel, Ichika has a dream where he accepts power from a young girl and a warrior woman, driven from his desire to protect his comrades. Houki cuts one of the wings off the Silver Gospel as it falls into the ocean, but it reemerges with angel wings as it goes into Second Shift and takes down the girls. Houki is soon awakened by Ichika in the Byakushiki Setsura, its Second Shift, and he gives her a new hair ribbon as a birthday gift. With their combined strength, Ichika and the girls finally destroy the Silver Gospel, with Ichika giving the finishing blow. As they return to their hotel, Chifuyu lectures them for defying orders, but allows them some rest and recuperation as a reward. At a seaside cliff before Tabane vanishes, Chifuyu realizes that Tabane not only coincidentally allowed Ichika to be the only male pilot in the academy, but Tabane also hacked the Silver Gospel to go berserk in order to debut the Akatsubaki. At the beach, Houki apologizes to Ichika for his injuries and admits her feelings for him. As Ichika attempts to kiss Houki, they are interrupted by the other girls, who were jealous at the scene, forcing Ichika to carry Houki to safety.
13	OVA	"A Sextet Yearns to Be in Love"; Transliteration: "Koi ni Kogareru Rokujūsō" (Japanese: 恋に焦がれる六重奏)	December 7, 2011
On a hot day of summer vacation, Charlotte's plan to spend time alone with Ichika at his house is somewhat ruined when Cecilia gets the same idea, later followed by Houki, Lingyin and Laura. They spend the afternoon playing games and cooking. The next day, Houki helps out at a summer festival being held at her family's shrine and is surprised when Ichika shows up. Her time alone with Ichika is soon ruined by the appearance of Ran Gotanda, who momentarily has been separated by her brother Dan Gotanda. Later, Houki attempts to confess her feelings to Ichika, but is instead drowned out by the fireworks. Houki holds Ichika's arm in a romantic moment.

=== Infinite Stratos 2 (2013) ===
No. overall	No. in season	Title	Original air date
14	1	"The Memory of a Summer"; Transliteration: "Hitonatsu no Omoide" (Japanese: 一夏(ひとなつ)の想いで)	October 4, 2013
Ichika Orimura has a dream in which the warrior woman from before suddenly turns evil and strangles him to death. He is later awoken by Laura Bodewig, who is wearing a one-piece swimsuit. After she suggests for the two of them to go to a newly reopened water park, she storms out in anger when he plans to invite the other girls. Laura decides to go shopping with Charlotte Dunois at a mall, where they end up becoming models in a clothing store and heroines in a hostage situation while working at the maid cafe. Charlotte and Laura enjoy eating crêpes afterwards. Meanwhile, a mysterious female code-named "M" infiltrates a heavily guarded facility in England to retrieve a confined IS using the Silent Zephyrus, an extremely powerful IS. Ichika and the girls have a fun time at the water park, despite him being blamed for presumably inviting each of them on a date. They go down on a couple's water slide and participate in the summer festival. They close by lighting sparklers, which marks the end of summer vacation. At the same time, Chifuyu Orimura and Maya Yamada check on an incident involving a new IS.
15	2	"Heart Pain Killer"; Transliteration: "Hāto Peinkirā" (Japanese: 恋スル☆舌下錠(ハート・ペインキラー))	October 11, 2013
After sparring with Lingyin Huang, Ichika runs late to class, where Chifuyu commands Charlotte to shoot him indirectly as punishment. After Ichika officially meets student council president Tatenashi Sarashiki at the school assembly, Laura suggests that the class should do a maid cafe as a fundraiser for the upcoming school festival. Unwilling to receive Tatenashi as an instructor, Ichika challenges her to a match, only for him to be defeated. Dreaming upon the grasslands, Ichika appears to see Houki Shinonono before awaking in Tatenashi's lap and dodging Laura's surprise attack. Tatenashi takes Ichika to train in circle rondo formation with Cecilia Alcott and Charlotte. Later on, Tatenashi coaches Ichika to practice the circle rondo formation by flying around a red orb at high speeds, but he ends up crashing into the wall. While having dinner, Houki, Cecilia, Lingyin, Charlotte and Laura all try to comfort Ichika, but he falls asleep from exhaustion.
16	3	"Translucent Chord of Cinderella's Heel"; Transliteration: "Shinderera Hīru no Sukiiro Waon" (Japanese: 硝子少女(シンデレラ・ヒール)の透色和音)	October 18, 2013
In the morning, Tatenashi extorts Ichika for a massage, much to his dismay. Later during the school festival, Lingyin stops by the maid cafe, where Ichika serves as the butler. She orders a wineglass filled with chocolate sticks which includes a special, wherein she gets to personally feed Ichika, but she slaps him and leaves in embarrassment after he says that she eats like a cute squirrel. An IS expansion saleswoman named Reiko Makigami makes Ichika uncomfortable when she asks him to try on her company's equipment. As Ichika goes on break, Cecilia takes him to the brass band exhibition, but Cecilia blows her chance of getting an indirect kiss with a French horn. Tatenashi forces Ichika into being the prince of the student council's rendition of Cinderella, but he is unaware that whoever gets his crown receives the right to live with him. Under constant fire against the girls, Ichika manages to survive the absurdity of the play, which involves running from booby traps set by Tatenashi, only to be pursued by the walk-in contestants. Ichika is dragged under stage in the locker room by Reiko, who desires to steal the Byakushiki.
17	4	"The Mysterious Lady"; Transliteration: "Misuteriasu Reidi" (Japanese: ミステリアス・レイディ)	October 25, 2013
Reiko unleashes the Arachne, revealing herself to be Autumn from the underground organization, Phantom Task. After restraining Ichika, Autumn reveals that it was Phantom Task who abducted Ichika during the Second Mondo Grosso while she forcibly attempts to take the Byakushiki. Cecilia and Lingyin engage M using the Silent Zephyrs in the sky, while Tatenashi uses the Mysterious Lady, equipped with water manipulated in all forms by nanomachines, to engage Autumn in the locker room. As Ichika pursues Autumn outside, he is intercepted by M, who successfully deters him. M and Autumn retreat before Houki, Charlotte and Laura join in the fight. Maya briefs Chifuyu that the Silent Zephyrus was the second Blue Tears stolen from England, while Chifuyu states that Tatenashi's true objective was to train and safeguard Ichika. At an unknown location, Autumn berates M for her interference, but they are intervened by Squall Meusel, leader of Phantom Task. M awaits her revenge while staring at a locket containing a photo of Chifuyu. Tatenashi not only tells Ichika about her purpose of protecting him, but also the ulterior motive behind the prince's crown, which she now possesses.
18	5	"Lovely Style"; Transliteration: "Raburī Sutairu" (Japanese: ラブリー・スタイル)	November 1, 2013
By request of Maya, Ichika is lured to an event where each of the girls are allowed to provide service for him for a limited amount of time. Houki initially stumbles while performing a Japanese tea ceremony to him while dressed as a fox priestess, then Cecilia plays nine-ball with him while wearing a Playboy Bunny costume. Charlotte serves Ichika some cookies while dressed as a French poodle, but she is disqualified for accidentally going overboard. Laura wears a Playboy Bunny costume as well and plays darts with him, but he ends up with her one-piece swimsuit as a prize. Tatenashi appears to join the party and teases Ichika wearing a cat suit, only turning into a brief fiasco with Lingyin (who was originally supposed to wear the costume). After Chifuyu serves him a sundae while dressed as a maid, it is revealed that all of this was part of a surprise birthday party prepared for him. When Maya asks Ichika to choose which girl wore the best costume, he chooses Chifuyu's instead, causing the girls to angrily attack him for his stupidity. Afterwards, Ichika is approached by M, who introduces herself as Madoka Orimura and shoots him off screen.
19	6	"The Secret Base"; Transliteration: "Za Shīkuretto Bēsu" (Japanese: 乙女の矜持(ザ・シークレット・ベース))	November 8, 2013
Laura arrives in time to protect Ichika, who managed to deflect Madoka's shot with his IS gauntlet, causing Madoka to flee in retaliation. Some time later, Ichika offers to assist Charlotte in escorting IS equipment at the port, but they are faced against two IS pilots armed with rifles. One of the IS pilots causes an explosion, wherein Ichika shields Charlotte from the blast. However, Ichika is advised to confiscate the Byakushiki back at the academy due to a detected abnormality. Charlotte finds herself in a predicament when her underwear vanishes mysteriously, thus she is forced to keep quiet and prevent Ichika from finding out. Houki, Cecilia and Lingyin manage to have Charlotte reveal the truth about the situation with the Byakushiki, resulting in the three of them fighting for the right to become Ichika's bodyguard. Tatenashi interrupts to reprimand the three for causing a commotion inside the school. Just when Charlotte decides to reveal her predicament to Ichika, Laura appears and confirms that Charlotte's underwear returned, as both detected abnormalities have now subsided. Back at their room, Laura points out to Charlotte that all her troubles could have been averted if she had worn bloomers instead of panties, much to her chagrin.
20	7	"Sisters"; Transliteration: "Shisutāzu" (Japanese: シスターズ)	November 15, 2013
Tatenashi watches over her younger sister, Kanzashi Sarashiki, who is feeling gloomy since her personal IS, the Uchigane Nishiki, was delayed due to the development company focusing on the Byakushiki. Ichika and Houki are invited by newspaper club vice president Kaoruko Mayuzumi to be put on exclusive magazines for personal IS pilots, using dinner tickets as bribery. The two then have a personal interview and an intimate photo shoot hosted by Kaoruko's older sister Nagisako Mayuzumi. Wondering about Madoka, Ichika later asks Chifuyu if they have any other sisters, but she says that he is her only family. With a tag match tournament coming up, Lingyin and Charlotte try to butter him up with food, figuring out what type of partner he would choose. Tatenashi entrusts Kanzashi to Ichika for the upcoming tag match tournament. He rejects Laura, which brings Houki and Cecilia to assume that he would partner with one of them. As Ichika tries to approach Kanzashi, she turns down the proposal in anger instead.
21	8	"Open Your Heart"; Transliteration: "Ōpun Yua Hāto" (Japanese: オープン・ユア・ハート)	November 22, 2013
Ichika is slapped by Kanzashi when he becomes persistent to be her partner. He later finds it difficult to look up on maintenance assistance for the Uchigane Nishiki because Kanzashi assembled it herself. Upon realizing that Ichika insists on pairing with Kanzashi for the tag match tournament, the girls take their time training more aggressively, determined to make him regret not choosing them. As Tatenashi devises Houki to team up with her, she analyzes Houki's physical maneuver, only to learn that her aptitude is up to level S already, much to her surprise. Kanzashi takes the Uchigane Nishiki for a test run, but it malfunctions. Ichika saves her before she crashes, giving her a change of heart towards Ichika as she indirectly agrees to be his partner. Ichika shares data from the Byakushiki to help improve the Uchigane Nishiki, and has the maintenance students gladly help. Returning to his dorm room, Tatenashi insists upon Ichika for another massage, telling him that Chifuyu is so strict on him because she cares about him. Hoping to give Ichika a bag of muffins as a gift, Kanzashi reaches his door, where she overhears that Ichika's generous offer was Tatenashi's idea. Heartbroken, Kanzashi runs off in tears.
22	9	"The Requirements for a Hero"; Transliteration: "Hiirou no Jōken" (Japanese: ヒーローの条件)	November 29, 2013
Ichika searches for Kanzashi, who starts developing the fear of incompetence. Tatenashi announces the tag match tournament at the opening ceremony. However, the arena is suddenly attacked by five advanced Golems. Ichika and Kanzashi take on a Golem, while Houki and Tatenashi charge against another Golem. Tatenashi fails to penetrate its armor, causing an explosion and rendering her weak. This enrages Kanzashi to fight the Golem until her weapon power is depleted. Kanzashi feels hopeless until she is then protected by Tatenashi, who ends up gravely injured. Deep within her subconscious, Kanzashi is encouraged by Ichika and Tatenashi to never run away and always accept her weaknesses. After Houki replenishes Ichika's shield energy, Kanzashi uses Tatenashi's aqua crystal as a good luck charm, allowing them to destroy all five Golems. Recuperating in the infirmary, Tatenashi contemplates how reliable Ichika can be, as she and Kanzashi have a friendly sister-to-sister talk. Meanwhile, Maya manages to recover two of the Golems, as Chifuyu plans to notify the government. Kanzashi gives Ichika an anime movie as a gift, and she confesses her love to him before running off. She later realizes that she accidentally blurted out by saying that she loves anime instead.
23	10	"Cooking My Way"; Transliteration: "Kukkingu Mai Uei" (Japanese: クッキング・マイ・ウェイ)	December 6, 2013
Houki, Cecilia, Lingyin, Charlotte and Laura are relieved when Kanzashi sees Ichika as just a friend. Meanwhile, Maya calls Ichika to the infirmary to have him take the body measurements for IS improvements, resulting in a somewhat embarrassing fiasco. During lunch, after hearing how Ichika loves the other girls' cooking, Cecilia later ask Houki to help her make fried chicken. When Houki steps out of the kitchen, Cecilia purposely adds perfume and hot mustard to the fried chicken for a sparkly appearance. Houki comes back to sample it, wherein Houki is shown absent during class the next day. Cecilia later meets up with Charlotte to cook pot-au-feu. When Charlotte goes to tuck Laura in bed, Cecilia again adds perfume and hot mustard to the dish. After sampling it, both Charlotte and Laura end up absent the following day. Cecilia asks Lingyin to help her cook sweet and sour pork. However, Cecilia deliberately blows up the kitchen pot after Lingyin mentions that her electric stove is a slow burner. After Cecilia feels disappointed in herself, Ichika brings Cecilia to his room, where they make rice balls together. At a fancy restaurant, Tabane Shinonono easily defeats Phantom Task, but she offers to make a personal IS for Madoka.
24	11	"Looking For Memories"; Transliteration: "Rukkingu Fō Memorīzu" (Japanese: 恋こがれ京舞台(ルッキング・フォー・メモリーズ))	December 13, 2013
Ichika and his class go on a leisurely field trip to Kyoto, with one of the highlights being a visit to the Kiyomizu Temple scheduled in the evening. When Cecilia stands near the autumn leaves, Ichika takes a picture of the autumn leaves, mistakenly not taking her into account. After Charlotte helps Ichika fish for his lens cover under the bridge, they head to the shrine, where Cecilia, Lingyin, Charlotte and Laura vie for his attention. While evading the four, Ichika crosses paths with Kanzashi and carries her, only to crash into Houki. Following a picnic with the girls, Ichika and Houki walk into a bamboo forest, where Squall appears and takes a picture for them. Ichika becomes curious after Squall departs with mentioning him by name. Later, Ichika drops his camera off the balcony of the temple. At the stairway, he encounters Madoka, who attacks him, piloting her personal IS, the Black Knight. On top of a tower, Tatenashi fights Squall, who is armed with the Golden Dawn. Houki and Cecilia look for Ichika at the temple, but the two are attacked by Autumn. The rest of the students and staff head back to the academy on the monorail, but it begins to malfunction.
25	12	"Girls Over"; Transliteration: "Gåruzu Ōbā" (Japanese: 少女たちの展翅(ガールズ・オーバー))	December 20, 2013
While evading Squall, Tatenashi alerts Kanzashi that there is a bomb planted onboard the monorail. Ichika manages to prevent Madoka from blasting the monorail. Houki and Cecilia pin down Autumn and kill her in an explosion. However, the two later witness Madoka stabbing Ichika, just as the bomb explodes in the distance. Houki catches Ichika and cries for him to awaken. After the bomb was located, Lingyin, Charlotte, Laura and Kanzashi luckily disarmed it in time. In a vision, Ichika is seized by Madoka, but a young girl in white lends Ichika a helping hand. Lingyin, Charlotte, Laura and Kanzashi are thwarted by Squall after trying to disable Madoka. Tatenashi, who diverts Squall with a shot to break her barrier, signals Ichika to attack in White Knight form, but Madoka intercepts him. After Squall fires Ichika to the ground, Squall and Madoka withdraw, as they have collected enough data. In a hot springs bath, Ichika relaxes while thinking about Madoka's locket containing a photo of Chifuyu. He hides behind a rock when the girls enter the bath, since the owner mistakenly reversed the bath signs during his stay. Ichika submerges himself to keep quiet but eventually faints and floats over to the girls, causing them to scream.
26	OVA	"World Purge-hen"; Transliteration: "Wārudo Pāji-hen" (Japanese: ワールド・パージ編({{{2}}}))	November 26, 2014
A program called "World Purge" sends illusions to all the girls about their ideal fantasies.
