= Sony DSC-D700 =

Sony DSC-D700 Sony Cybershot D700
Overview
- Maker: Sony Group
- Released: 1998
- Production: Sony
- Intro price: US$1699

Sensor/medium
- Sensor: CCD sensor

General
- Battery: LiPo NP-F550
- Weight: 820 g (29 oz)

Sony DSC-D700 is a digital SLR camera by Sony designed for hobbyists photographers. The camera was introduced in December 1998 at a suggested retail price of 2,000 EUR (US$1,699). In the summer of 1999, it was replaced by a slightly modified version, the DSC-D770.

== Description ==
The camera features a 1/2-inch sensor with a resolution of 1.5 million pixels and a fixed 5x zoom lens. The camera's mirror is fixed and semi-transparent, which, for the first time in digital SLR cameras, allowed the optical viewfinder to be used simultaneously with the LCD display.

=== Specifications ===
- Sensor: 1/2" CCD sensor with 1.5 MP.
- Resolution: 1,344 x 1,024 pixels.
- Lens: 28 mm / F2.0 (5x zoom).
- LCD screen: 2.5" with 180,000 pixels.
- Exposure bracketing: no automatic, no internal HDR processing.
- Image stabilizer: no.
- Built-in flash: yes.
- Hot shoe: standard with central sync contact.
- AV jack: yes.
- Continuous shooting: 2 frames per second.
- Shortest shutter speed: 1/2000 second.
- Sensitivity: automatic, manual ISO from 50 to 400.
- Weight: 1025 grams.

=== Package Contents ===
- NP-F550 LiPo battery (1 pc.);
- BC-V615 charger (1 pc.);
- lens cap (1 pc.);
- viewfinder cap (1 pc.);
- remote control (1 pc.);
- A/V cable (1);
- MSAC-PR1 memory card adapter (1);
- user manual (1).

== See also ==
- List of Sony Cyber-shot cameras
