= Lens hood =

Photographic equipment

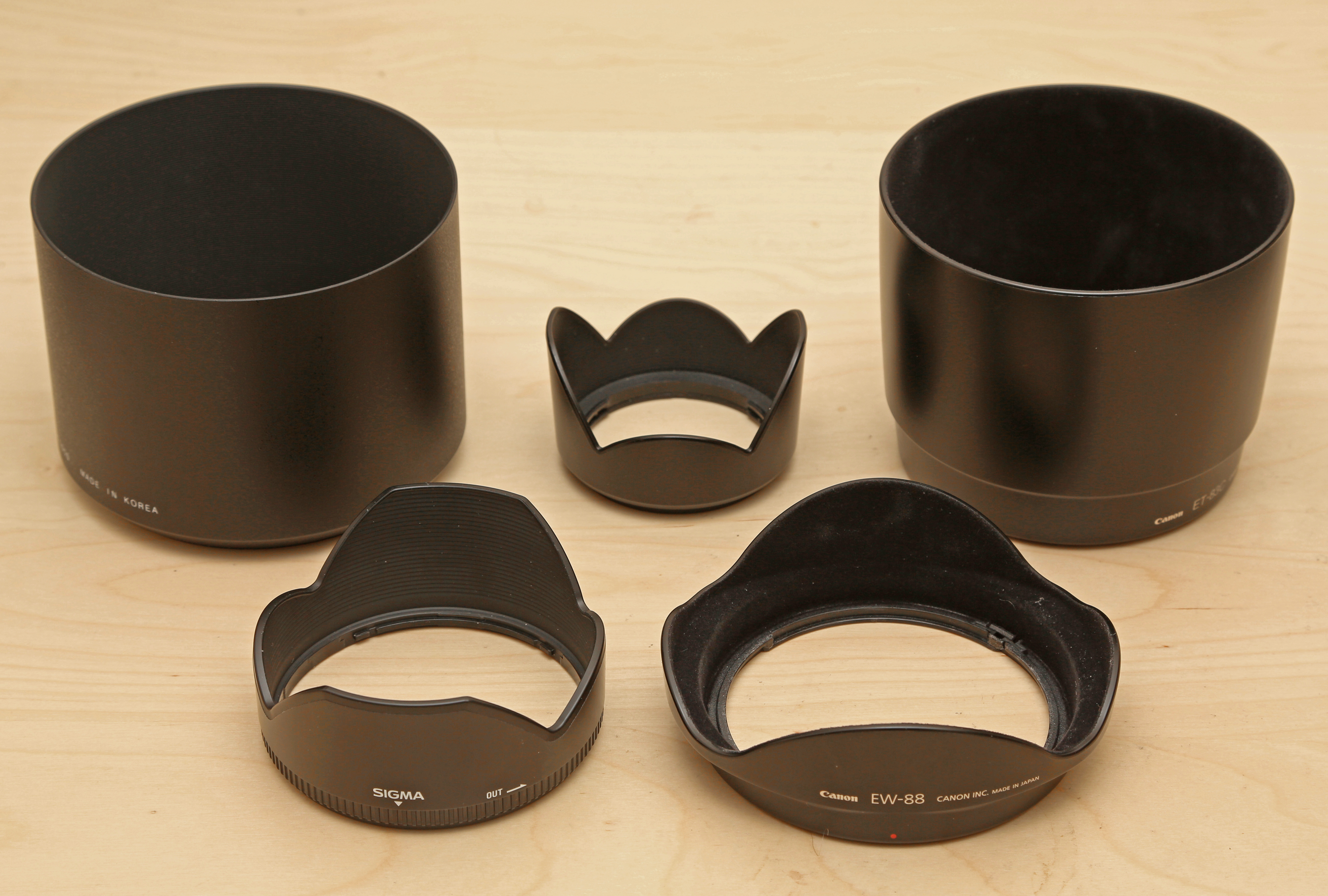
A selection of lens hoods: one cylindrical, one conical and three petal ones (one of them is chopped).

In photography, a lens hood or lens shade is a device used on the front end of a lens to block the Sun or other light source(s) to prevent glare and lens flare. Lens hoods may also be used to protect the lens from scratches and the elements without having to put on a lens cover.
The geometry of a lens hood is dependent on three parameters: the focal length of the lens, the size of the front lens element and the dimensions of the image sensor or film in the camera.

== Cause of lens flare ==
Scheme of a lens with lens flare. A lens hood is designed so that it does not block the angle of view of the lens. Lens hoods block the Sun or other light source(s) to prevent glare and lens flare.

Flare occurs when stray light strikes the front element of a lens and then bounces around within the lens. This stray light often comes from very bright light sources, such as the Sun, bright studio lights, or a bright white background. If a light source is in the lens' angle of view, a lens hood will hardly have any effect, but the light does not have to cause lens flare. It is sufficient that stray light from a bright light source enters the lens. Multi-layer coatings in newer lenses also help to reduce lens flare.

== Types ==
The shape of a lens hood can vary from a plain cylindrical or conical section (much like a lamp shade) to a more complex shape, sometimes called a petal, tulip, or flower hood. These more complex shapes take into account the final image's shape and aspect ratio. This allows the lens hood to block stray light with the longer portions of the lens hood, while allowing more light into the corners of the image through the shorter portions of the hood, thereby reducing the amount of mechanical vignetting (reduction of light around the periphery) in the final image.

The geometry of a lens hood is dependent on three things:

- focal length of the lens,
- size of the front lens element,
- dimensions of the image sensor or film in the camera.

Ideally, lens hoods should increase in length, and therefore in efficiency, as the focal length of the lens increases and the angle of view reduces. Lens hoods are more prominent in long focus lenses because they have a smaller viewing angle than that of wide-angle lenses. For wide angle lenses, the length of the hood (away from the end of the lens) cannot be as long as those for telephoto lenses, as a longer hood would enter the wider field of view of the lens.

Maximum aperture also affects the shape of a lens hood. As the aperture gets larger the amount of light and consequently the amount of the frame the sensor "sees" increases. This can be seen when comparing two lens hoods of the same focal length but with differing apertures – compare the lens hood of a telephoto f/4 lens with that of the same lens but with a maximum aperture of f/2.8.

Correctly made rectangular or square lens hoods are generally more efficient than cylindrical or conical ones because those shapes closely resemble the shape of the photograph. However, rectangular or square lens hoods should not be used with zoom lenses whose front elements rotate as the focal length is changed, as the hood will rotate as well, blocking parts of the angle of view. The same also applies to petal lens hoods. For these types of lenses, only cylindrical or conical lens hoods will work effectively.

In addition, lens hoods can offer some degree of physical protection for the lens due to the hood extending farther than the lens itself.

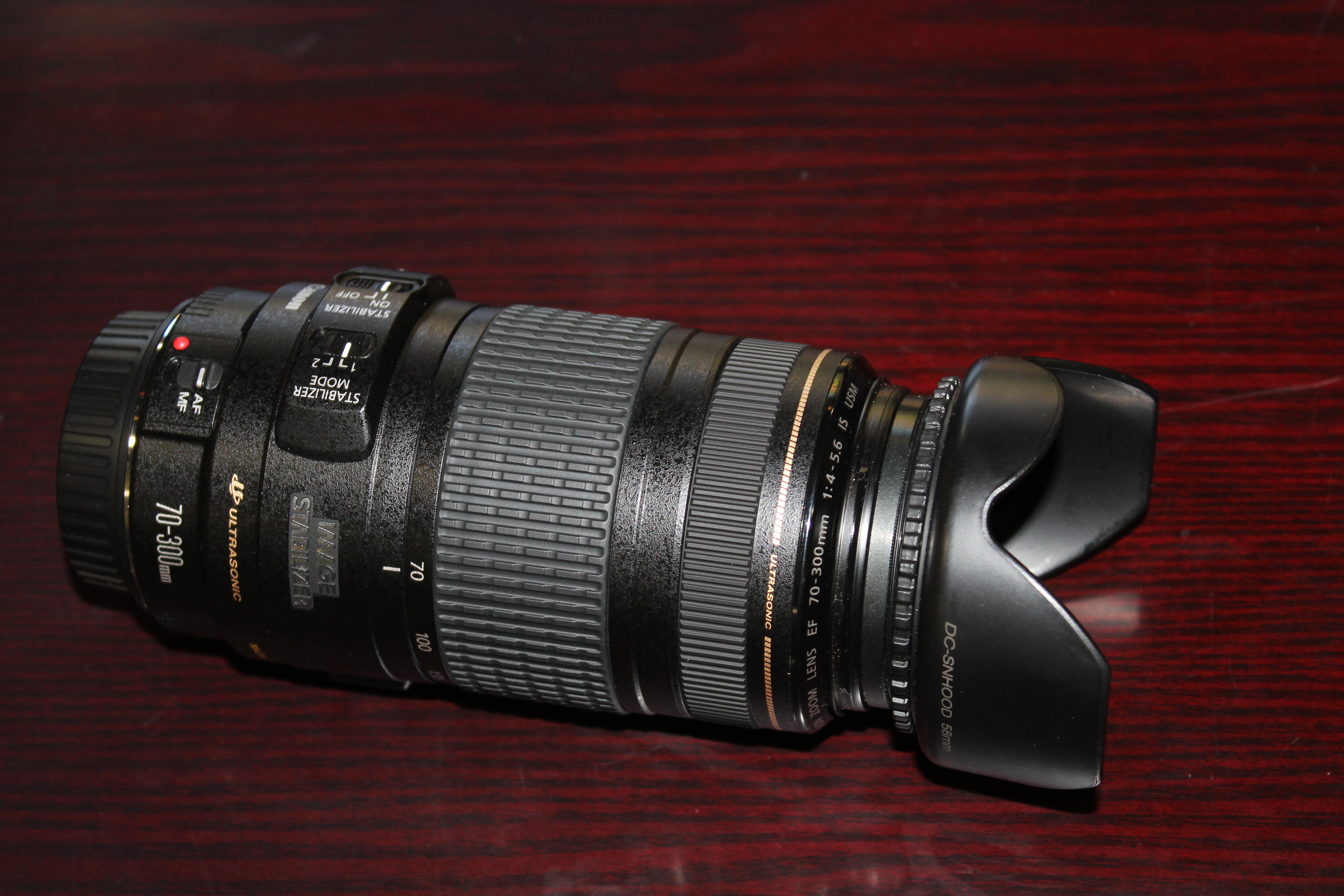
Chopped petal lens hood

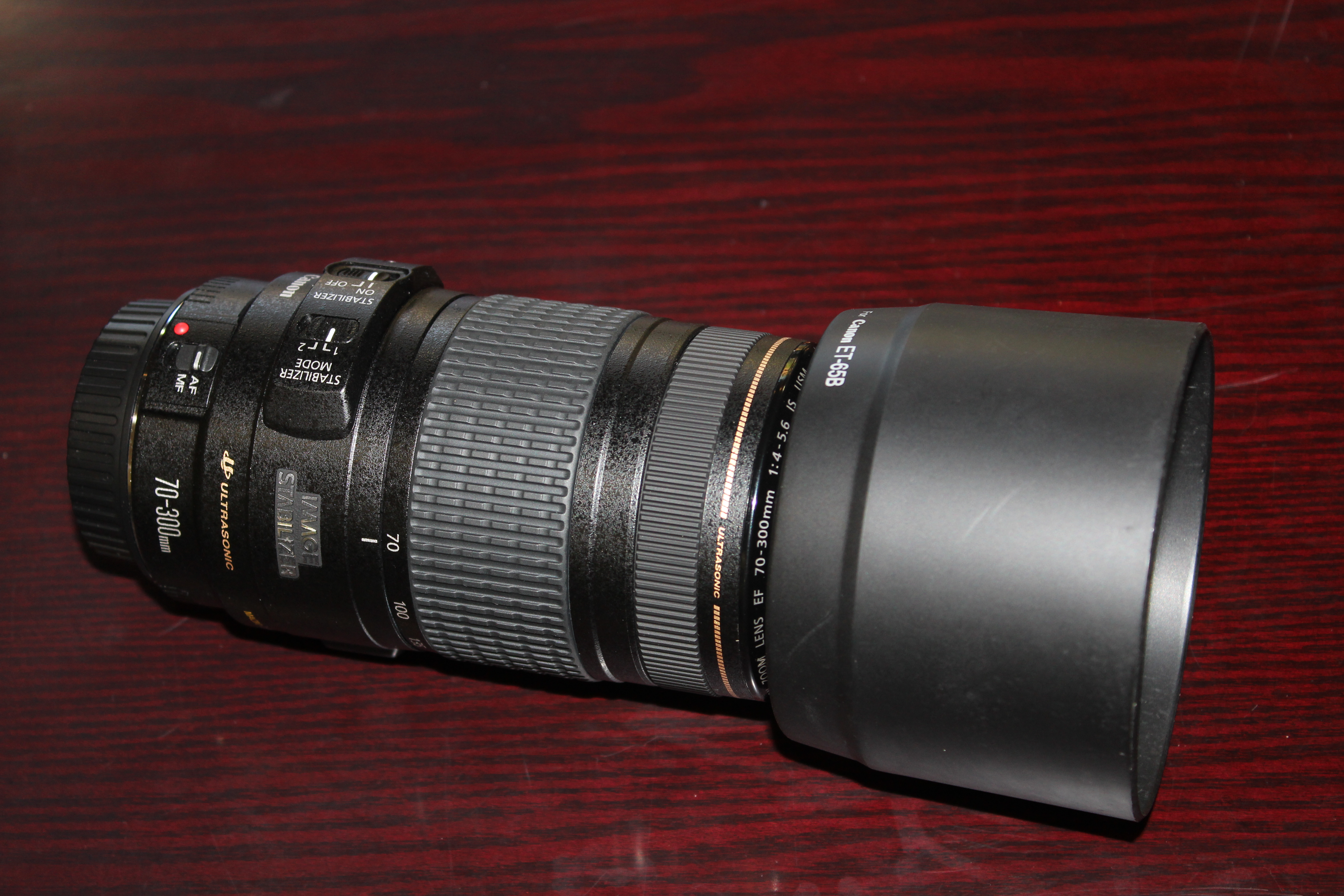
Conical lens hood

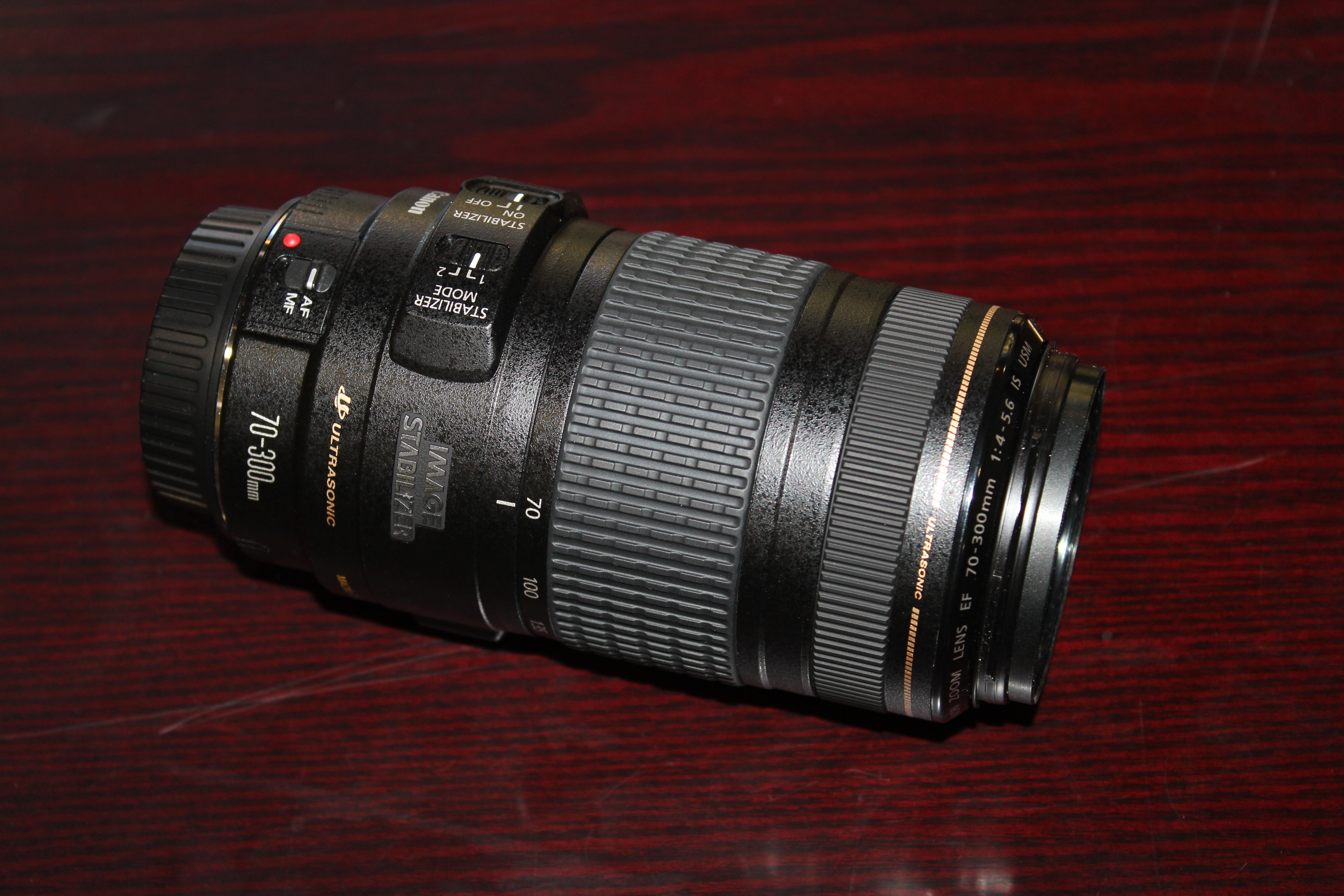
No lens hood

Canon EF 70–300 mm f/4–5.6 IS USM lens
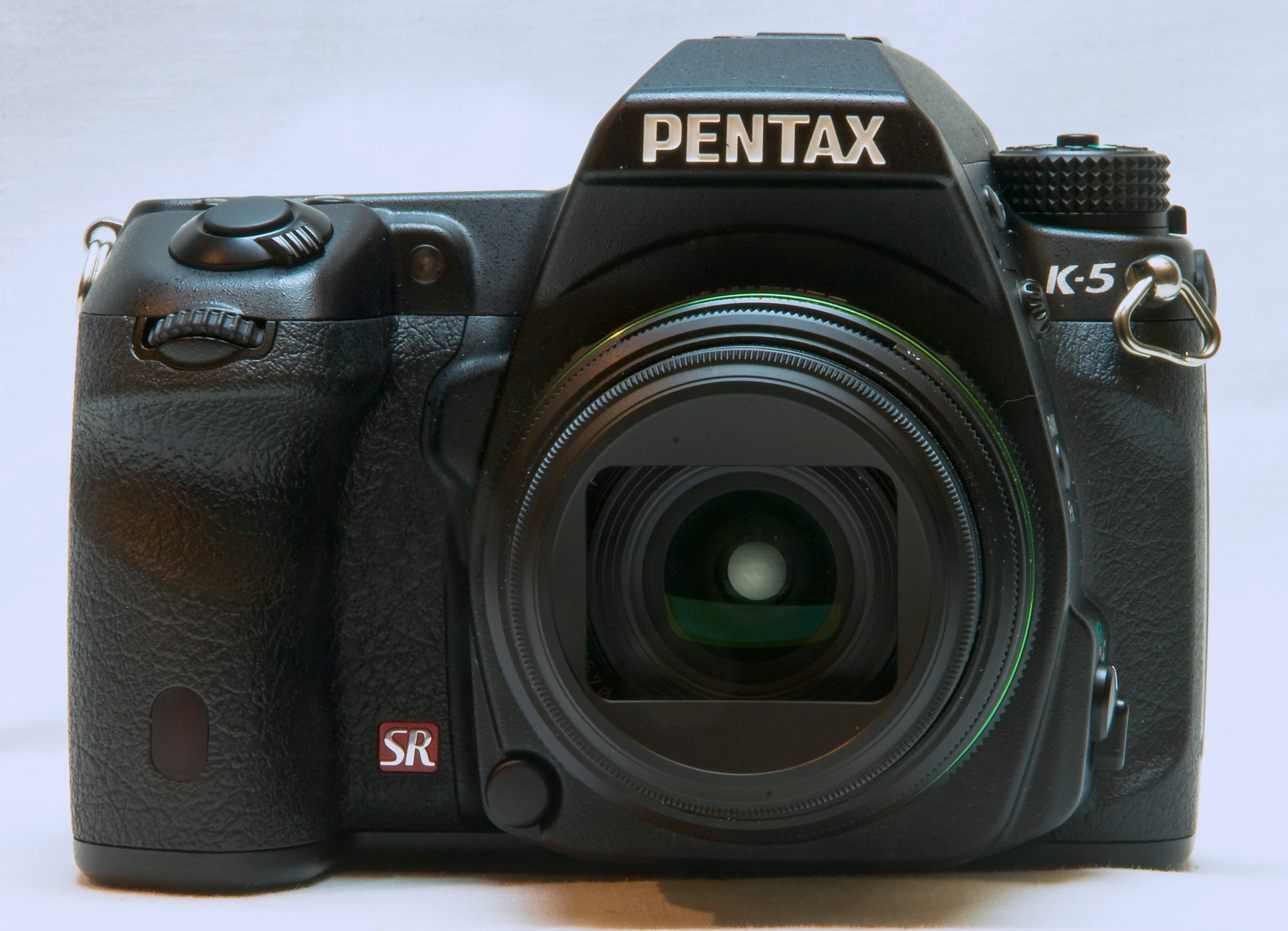
The "box" or "cut-out" type lens hood of a Pentax DA 21 mm f/3.2 Limited lens.

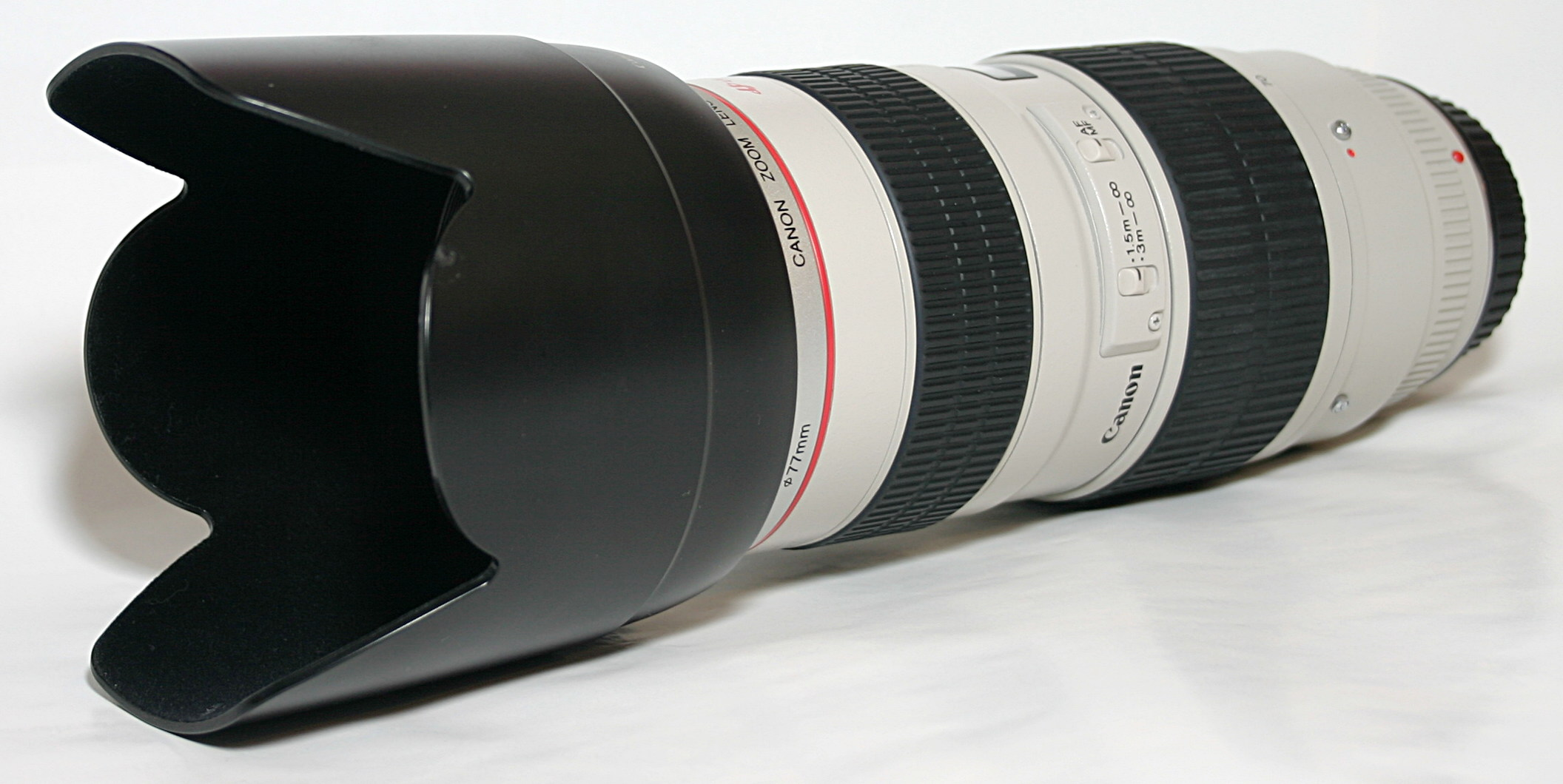
A conical chopped petal lens hood. Note that from this angle no part of the glass lens surface is visible, as the line of sight is blocked by the lens hood. (Canon EF 70–200 mm f/2.8).

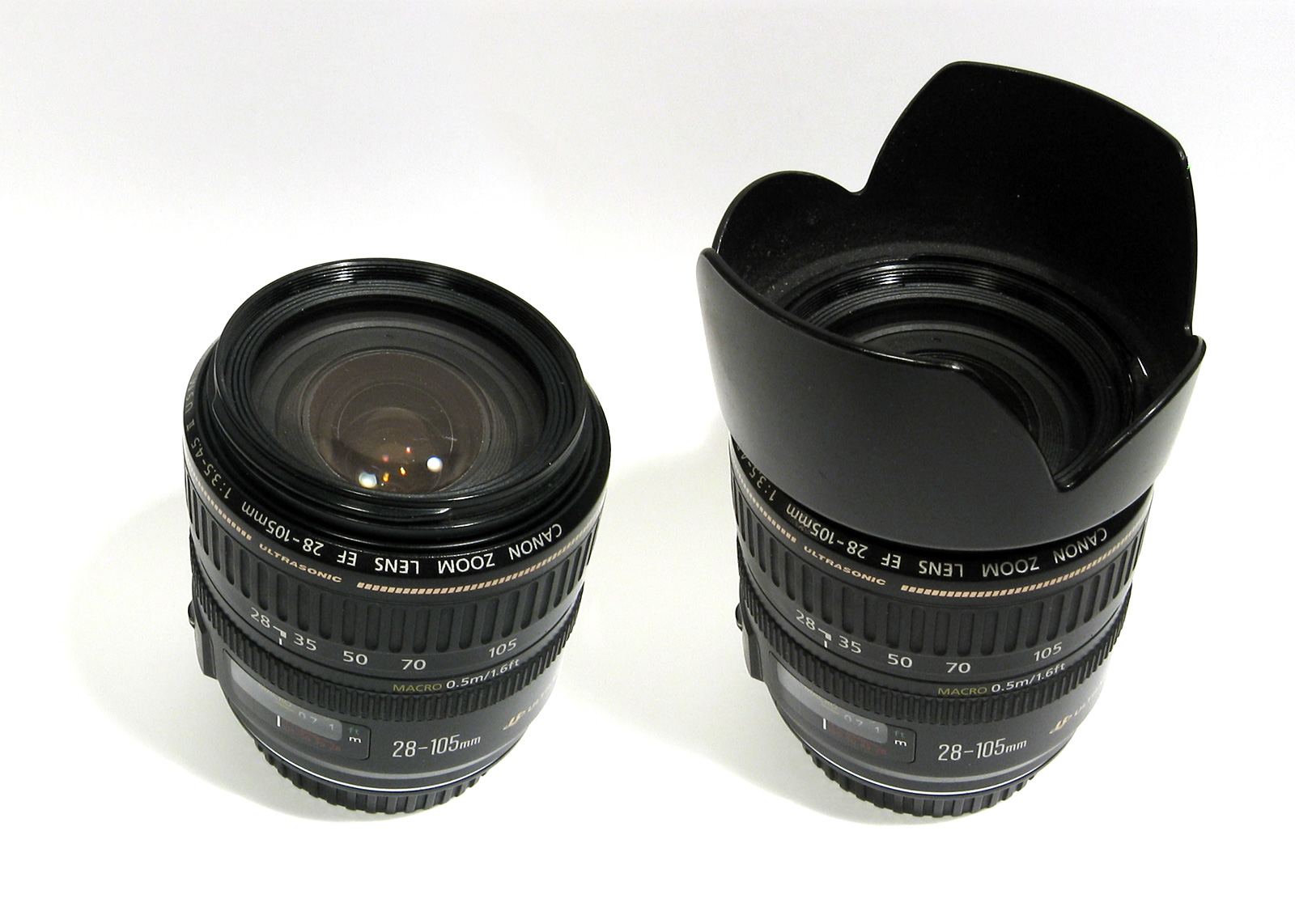
Lens without and with a conical chopped petal (or tulip) lens hood (Canon EF 28–105 mm f/3.5–4.5 USM II).

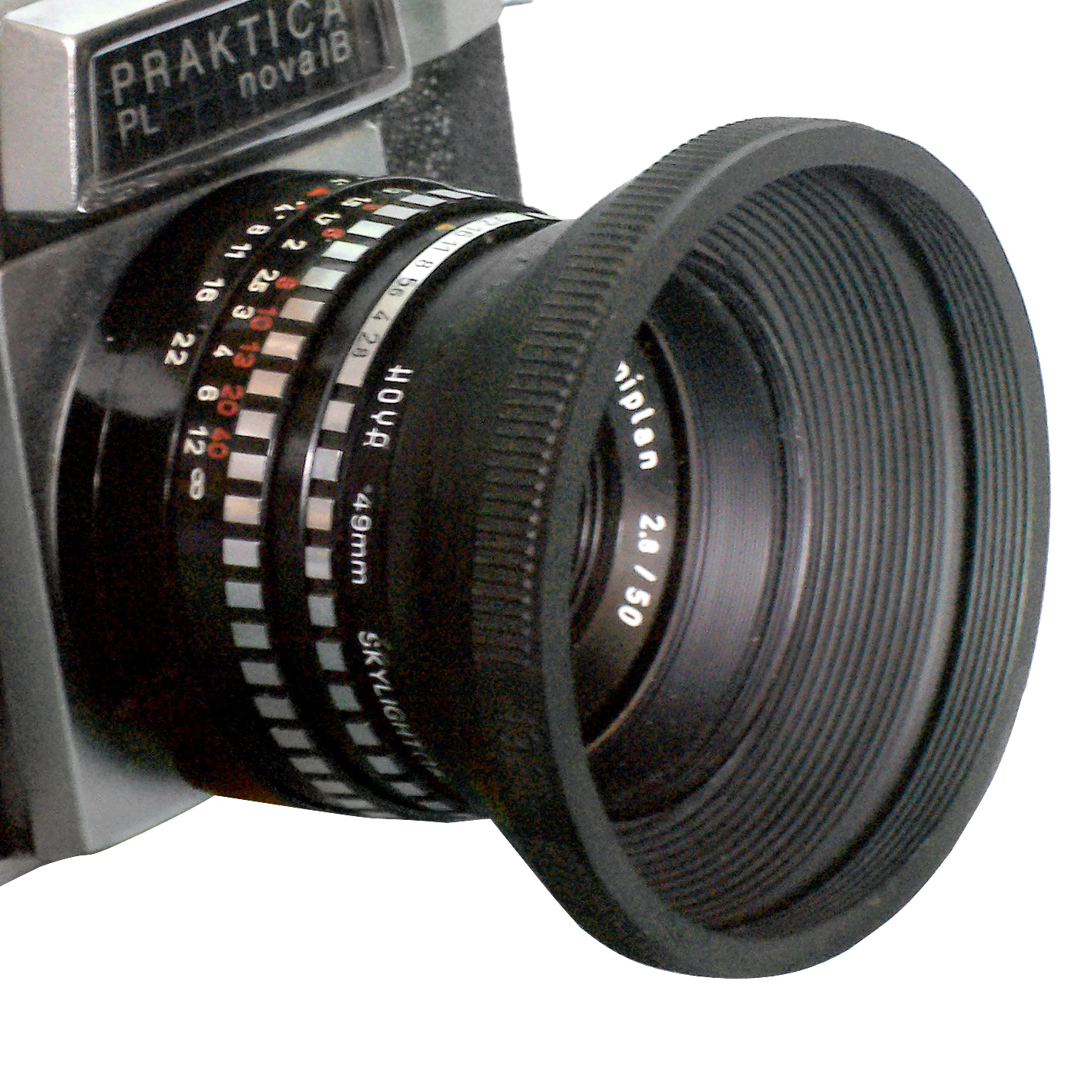
Praktica camera – lens with a conical collapsible rubber lens hood (50 mm f/2.8).

Lens hoods with an extending bellows design (much like the bellows of a medium or large format camera) can be adjusted for depth. This means that the depth can be increased when used on longer focal length lenses, and reduced as necessary for shorter focal length lenses.

== Storage ==
Lens hoods that are supplied by the manufacturer of the lens are often designed to fit onto the matching lens facing either forward, for normal use, or backwards, so that the hood may be stored with the lens without occupying much additional space. Rubber lens hoods are flexible and generally collapse for storage. However other lens hoods must be removed if these features are not available and length extension of the lens is not preferred during storage.

== See also ==
- Barn doors – similar device used for stage lights
- Lens cover
- Matte box – similar, adjustable device used in still photography and video
