= Matte box =

Camera lens hood

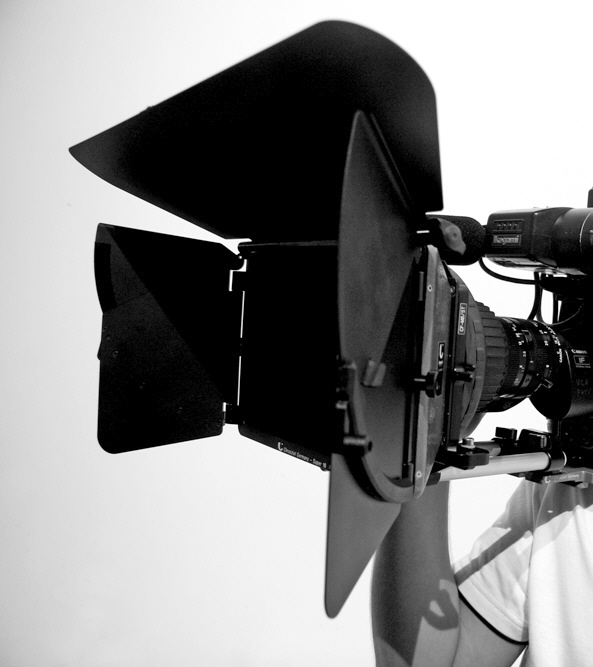
Cinema matte box

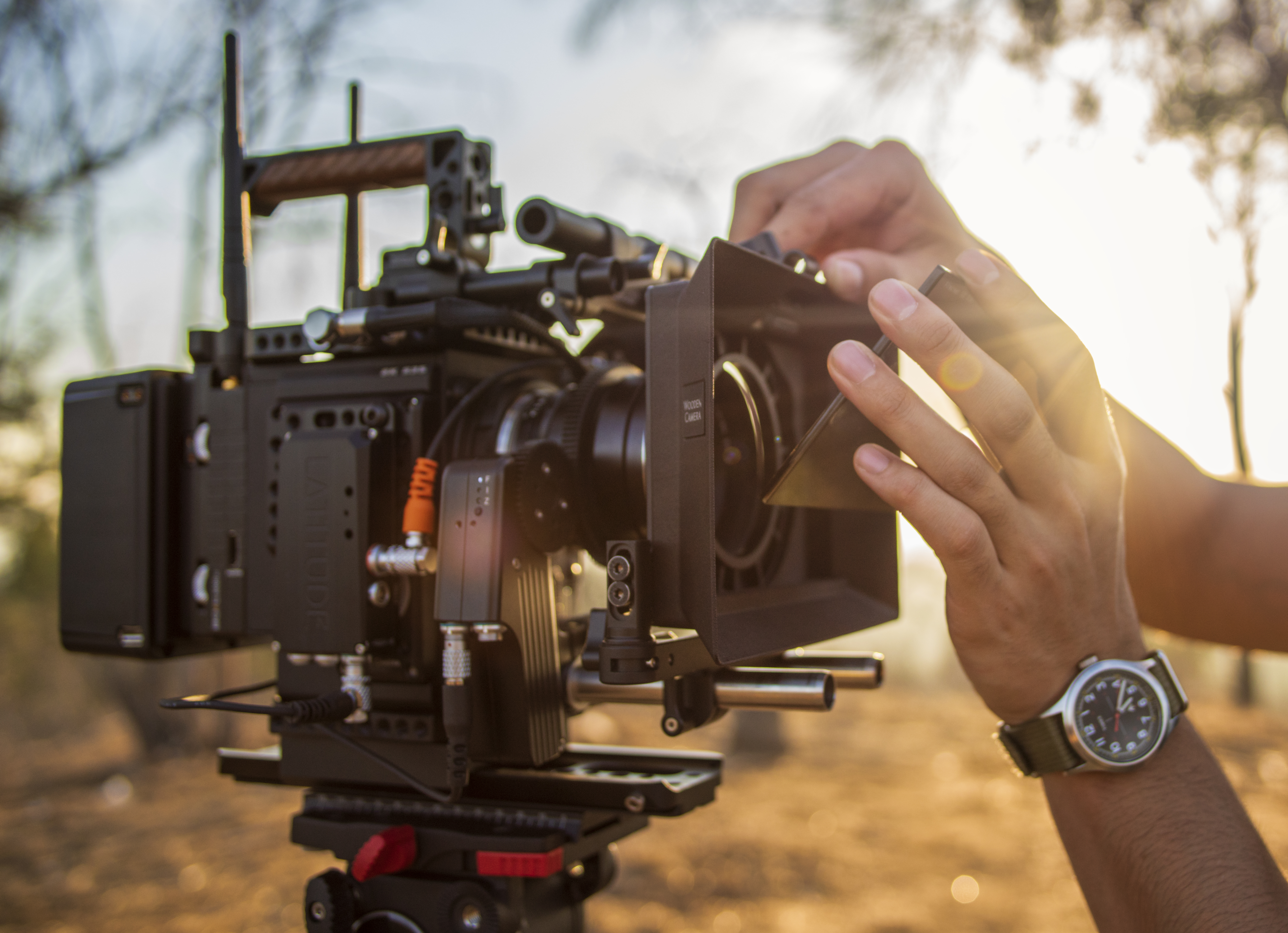
Lightweight matte box

In photography and videography, a matte box is a device attached to the end of a lens in order to prevent light leakage. It performs and mounts essentially the same as a lens hood, but usually includes adjustable fins called French flags.

Another purpose of a matte box is to hold filters in place in front of the lens. Some are supported by two rods that run the length of the camera, while others are supported by the lens itself.

A matte box may have a bellows, a rigid sunshade, or both. If both, the bellows is positioned within the rigid sunshade, having a mask which may be adjusted forward or backward to suit the angle of view of the camera system.

Matte Boxes are either mounted on two 15mm rods - an international standard - or the more heavy-duty 19mm rods. In cases of Steadicam or electronic gimbal shots that require lighter-weight rigging and accessories, cinematographers may opt for a clamp-on matte box that directly snaps onto the front of the lens.

== See also ==
- Barn doors – stage lights
- Lens hood – still camera
