= Lens flare =

Image artifact in a lens system

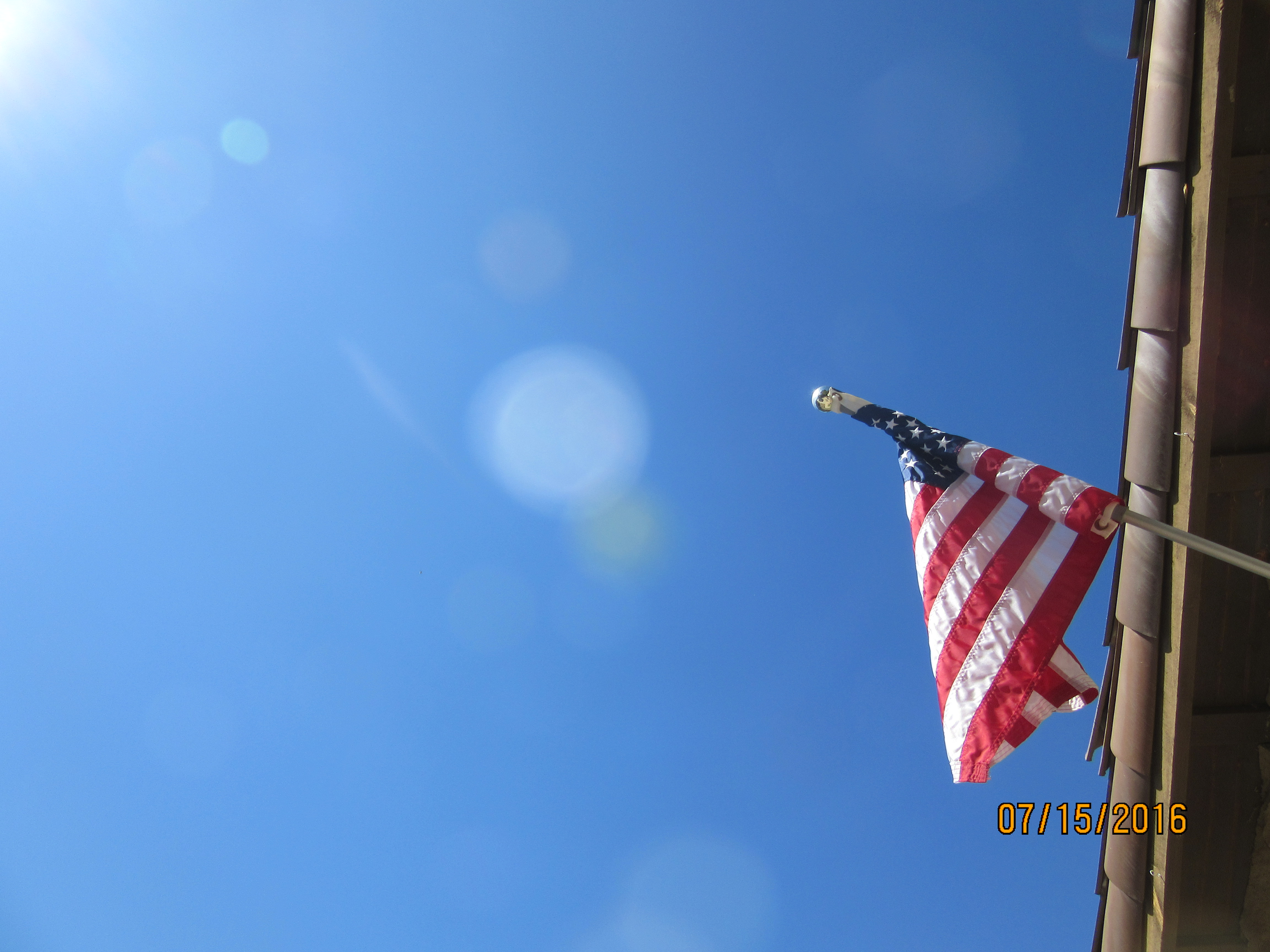
Lens flare against a blue sky, in the centre of the image

Scheme of lens flare

A lens flare is a visual artifact caused by light scattering, or flaring, in a lens system. This can happen through light scattered by the imaging mechanism itself, for example through internal reflection and forward scatter from material imperfections in the lens. Lenses with large numbers of elements such as zooms tend to have more lens flare, as they contain a relatively large number of interfaces at which internal scattering may occur. These mechanisms differ from the focused image generation mechanism, which uses rays that are from the reflection of light on the subject to be imaged and propagating along the intended paths in the lens system.

There are two types of flare: visible artifacts and glare across the image. The glare makes the image look "washed out" by reducing contrast and color saturation (adding light to dark image regions, and adding white to saturated regions, reducing their saturation). Visible artifacts, usually in the shape of the aperture made by the iris diaphragm, are formed when light follows a pathway through the lens that contains one or more reflections from the lens surfaces.

Flare is particularly caused by very bright light sources. Most commonly, this occurs when the lens is aimed toward the Sun (when the Sun is in frame or the lens is pointed sunward), and is reduced by use of a lens hood or other shade. For good-quality optical systems, and for most images (which do not have a bright light shining into the lens), flare is a secondary effect that is widely distributed across the image and thus not visible, although it does reduce contrast. In photography, lens flares are often undesirable, but they may be used intentionally to invoke a sense of drama or realism.

== Manifestation ==
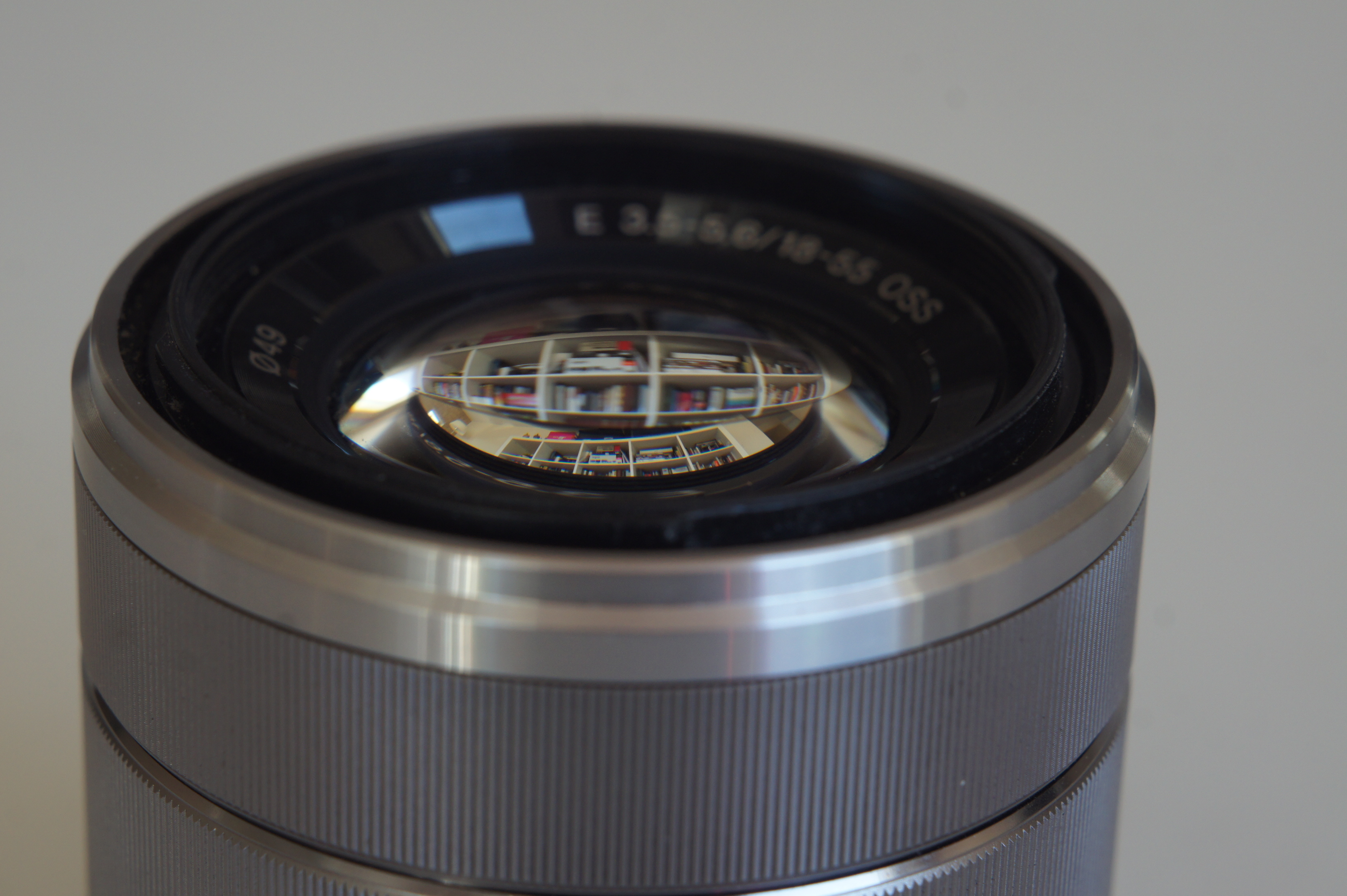
Light coming from a narrow angle may be "trapped" and reflected between the surfaces of the lens elements.

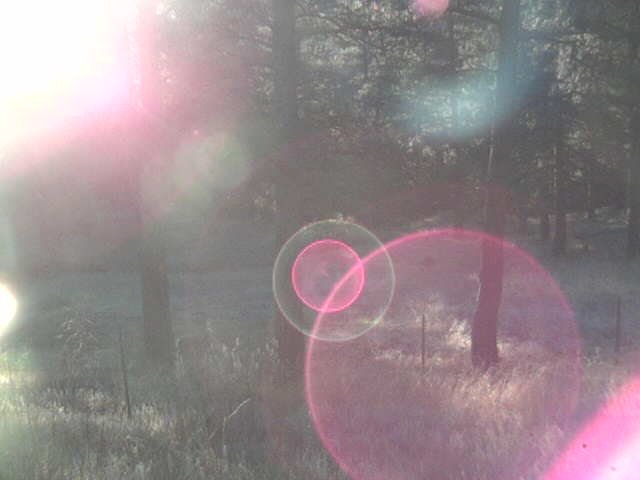
Severe flare in a CCTV camera lens

The spatial distribution of the lens flare typically manifests as several starbursts, rings, or circles in a row across the image or view. Lens flare patterns typically spread widely across the scene and change location with the camera's movement relative to light sources, tracking with the light position and fading as the camera points away from the bright light until it causes no flare at all. The specific spatial distribution of the flare depends on the shape of the aperture of the image formation elements. For example, if the lens has a 6-bladed aperture, the flare may have a hexagonal pattern.

Such internal scattering is also present in the human eye, and manifests in an unwanted veiling glare most obvious when viewing very bright lights or highly reflective surfaces. In some situations, eyelashes can also create flare-like irregularities, although these are technically diffraction artifacts.

When a bright light source is shining on the lens but not in its field of view, lens flare appears as a haze that washes out the image and reduces contrast. This can be avoided by shading the lens using a lens hood. In a studio, a gobo or set of barn doors can be attached to the lighting to keep it from shining on the camera. Filters placed in front of the lens, however, add further reflecting surfaces and can themselves cause flare (see below).

Flare is also reduced by anti-reflective coatings on the lens surfaces. Some coatings make the refractive index change gradually between glass and air: Nikon's Nano Crystal Coat, first used on the AF-S VR Nikkor 300mm f/2.8G IF-ED, consists of nanometre-sized particles with spaces between them, and Canon's Subwavelength Structure Coating, announced in 2008 with the EF 24mm f/1.4L II USM, uses wedge-shaped structures smaller than the wavelength of visible light and is particularly effective for light striking strongly curved elements at large angles of incidence.

When using an anamorphic lens, as is common in analog cinematography, lens flare can manifest itself as horizontal lines. This is most commonly seen in car headlights in a dark scene, and may be desired as part of the "film look".

== Deliberate use ==
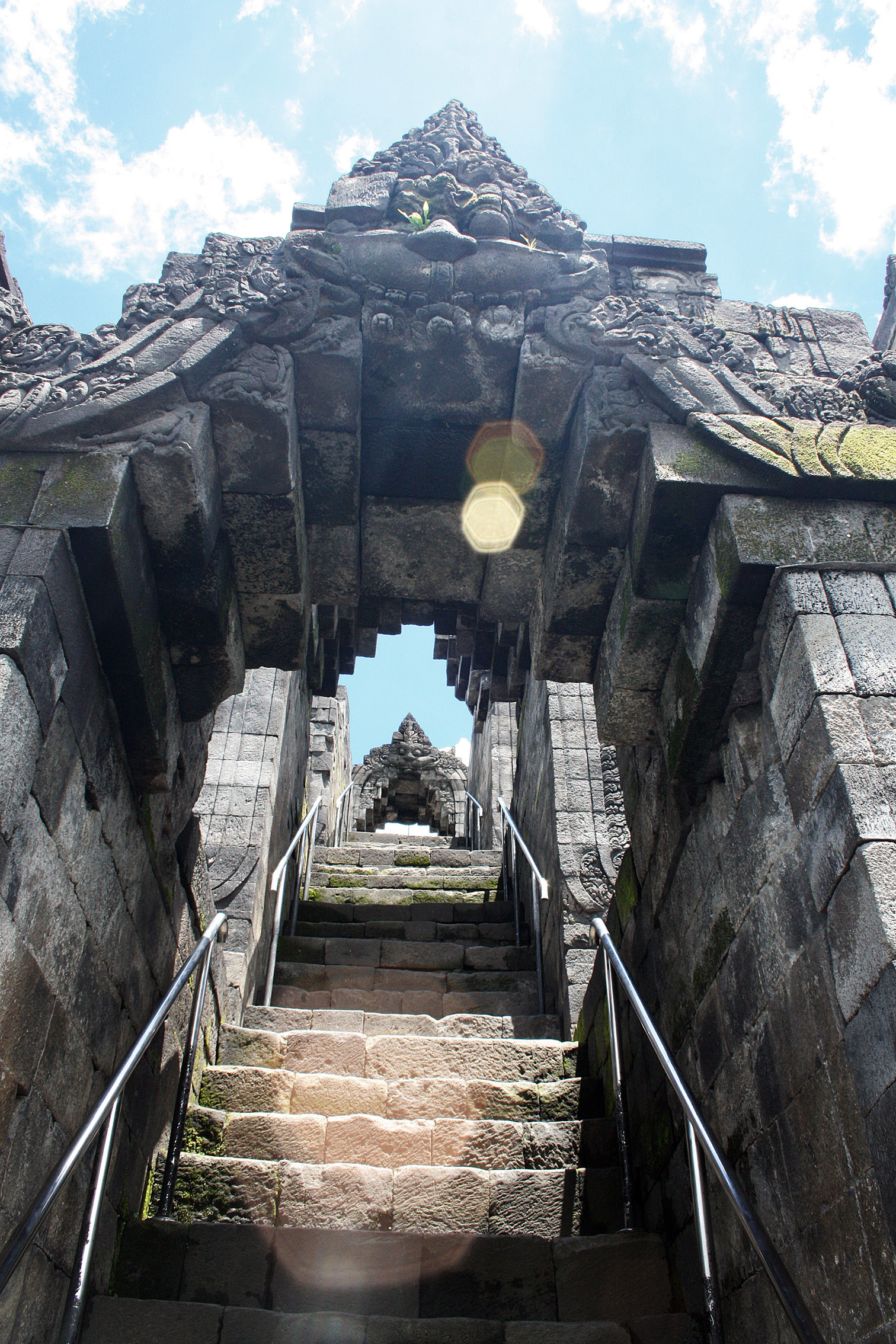
Deliberate use of lens flare on a photograph of the Borobudur stairs, to enhance the sense of ascending

A lens flare is often deliberately used to invoke a sense of drama. A lens flare is also useful when added to an artificial or modified image composition because it adds a sense of realism, implying that the image is an un-edited original photograph of a "real life" scene.

For both of these reasons (implying realism and/or drama) artificial lens flare is a common effect in various graphics editing programs, although its use can be a point of contention among professional graphic designers. Lens flare was one of the first special effects developed for computer graphics because it can be imitated using relatively simple means. Basic flare-like effects, for instance in video games, can be obtained by drawing starburst, ring, and disc textures over the image and moving them as the location of the light source changes. More sophisticated rendering techniques have been developed based on ray tracing or photon mapping.

Lens flare was typically avoided by Hollywood cinematographers, but the director J. J. Abrams deliberately added numerous lens flares to his films Star Trek (2009) and Super 8 (2011) by aiming powerful off-camera light sources at the lens. He explained in an interview about Star Trek: "I wanted a visual system that felt unique. I know there are certain shots where even I watch and think, 'Oh that's ridiculous, that was too many.' But I love the idea that the future was so bright it couldn't be contained in the frame." Many complained of the frequent use; Abrams conceded it was "overdone, in some places." In contrast, the low-budget independent film Easy Rider (1969) contains numerous incidental lens flares that resulted from Harrison Arnold's need to modify a camera car for his Arriflex as he shot motorcycle footage against landscapes of the Southwestern United States.

David Boyd, the director of photography of the sci-fi series Firefly, desired this style's evocation of 1970s television so much that he sent back cutting-edge lenses that reduced lens flare in exchange for cheaper ones.

== Other forms of photographic flare ==
=== Filter flare ===
The use of photographic filters can cause flare, particularly ghosts of bright lights (under central inversion). This can be eliminated by not using a filter, and reduced by using higher-quality filters or narrower aperture.

=== Diffraction artifact in digital cameras ===
One form of flare is specific to digital cameras. With the sun shining on an unprotected lens, a group of small rainbows appears. This artifact is formed by internal diffraction on the image sensor, which acts like a diffraction grating. Unlike true lens flare, this artifact is not visible in the eyepiece of a digital SLR camera, making it more difficult to avoid.

== Gallery ==
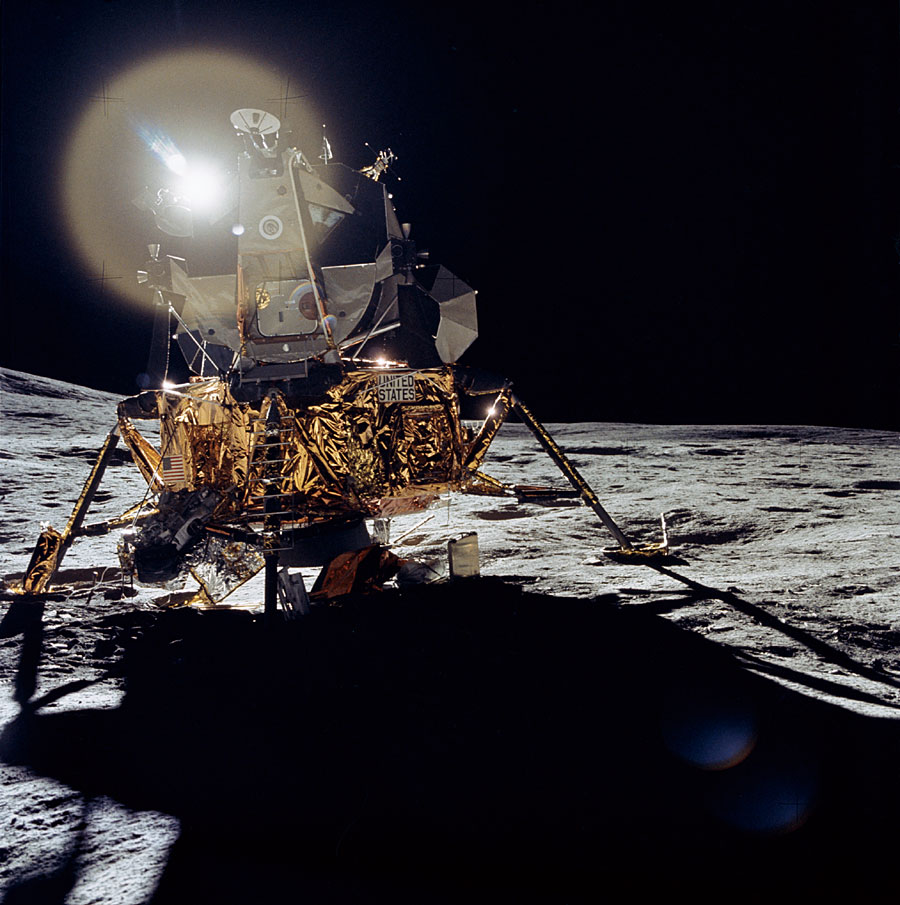
Photograph of an Apollo Lunar Module containing lens flare. Besides the obvious flare around the Sun, the light artifacts at the bottom right are also caused by flare.

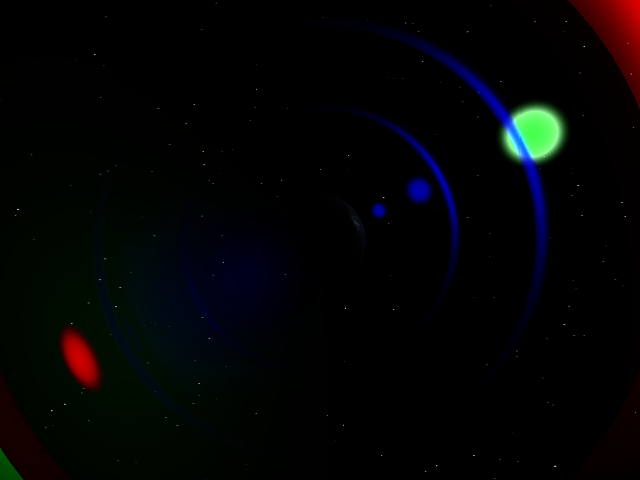
Sample of artificial lens flare, as might be used in an animated movie or video game

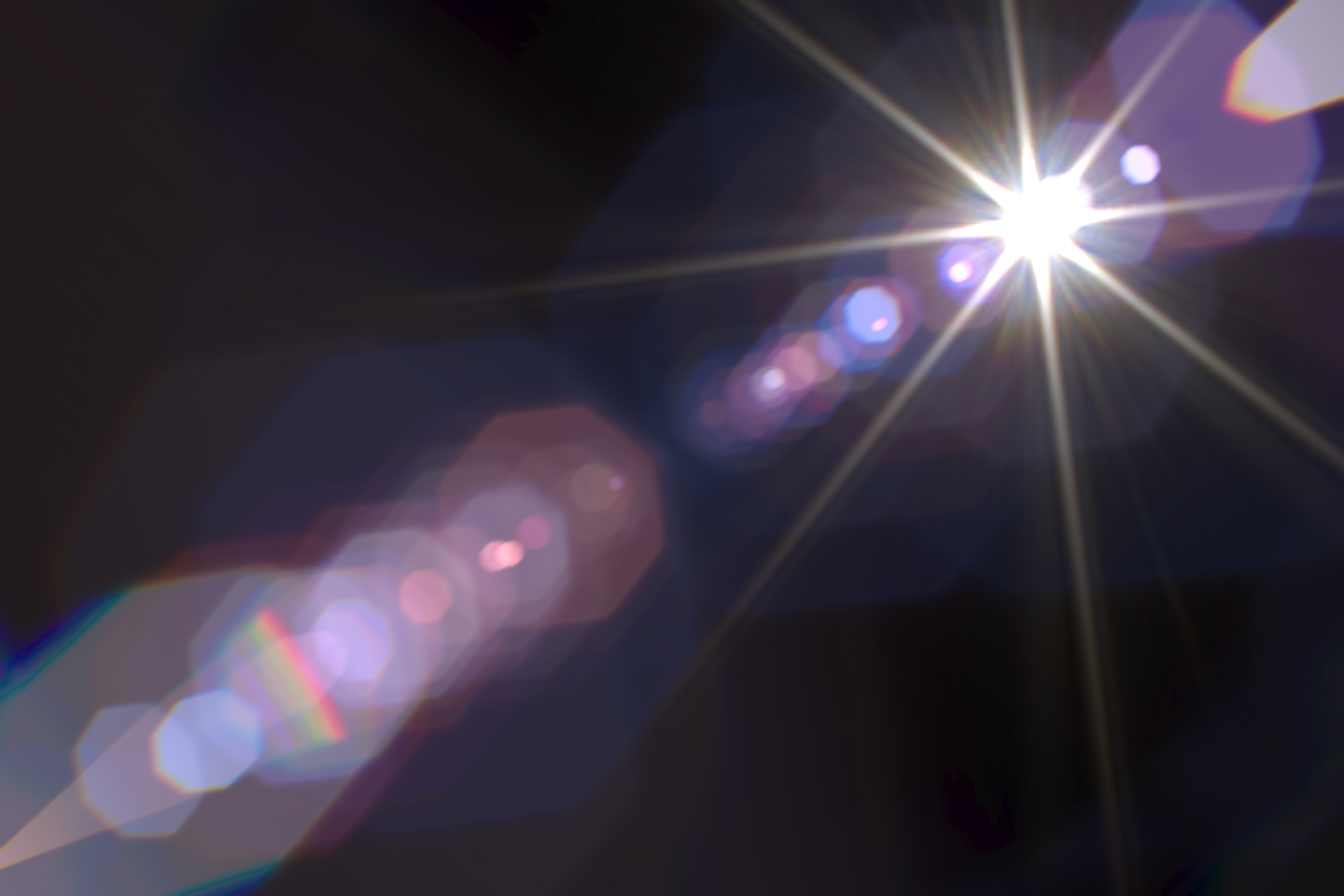
High-end rendering of a lens flare

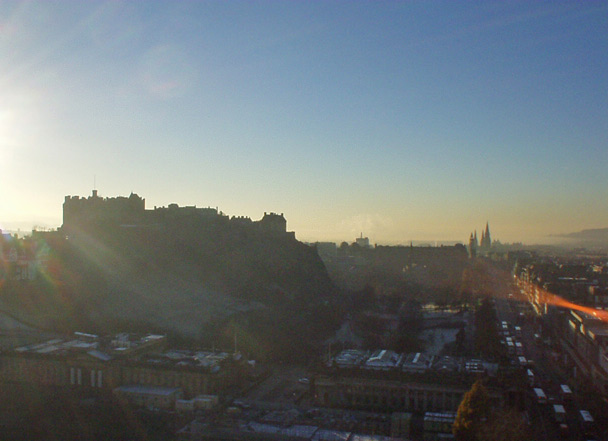
Lens flare is extremely difficult to control when a bright light source like the Sun is just outside the frame.

When the subject of a photo is the light source itself, lens flare can be a desirable and dramatic effect.

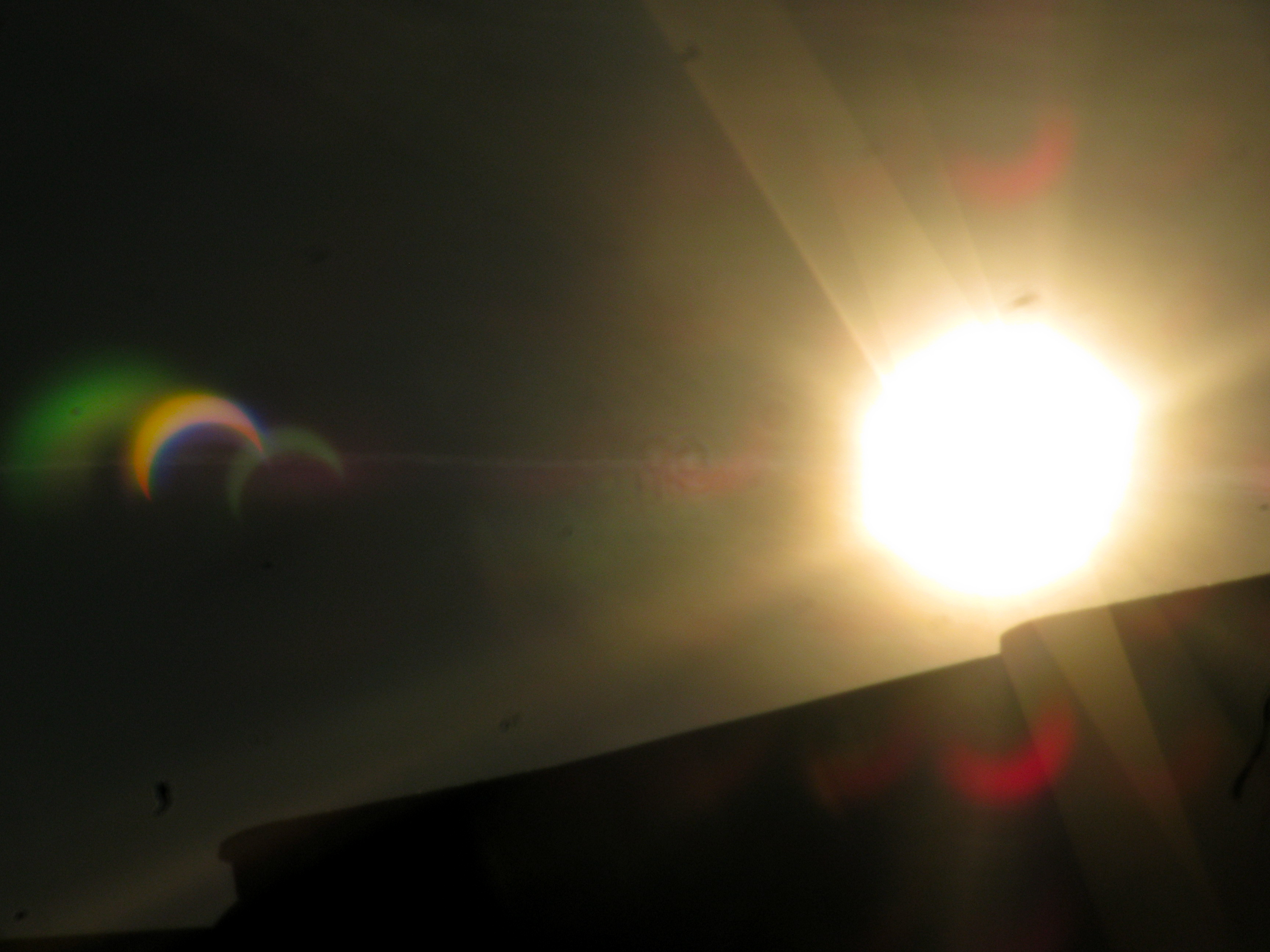
Lens flare used to capture details of too bright motive (partial solar eclipse)

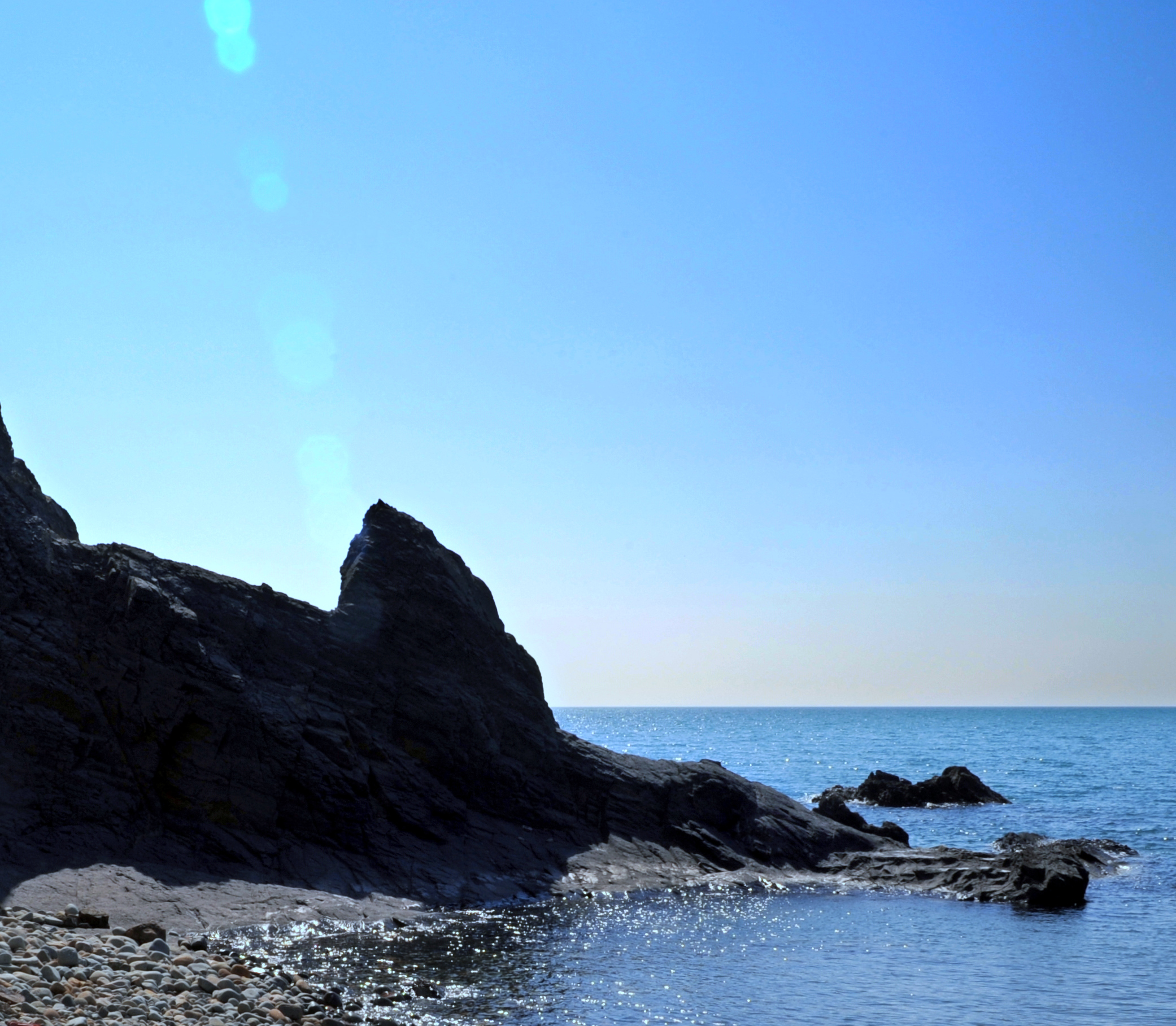
Lens flare—the Sun is outside the frame.

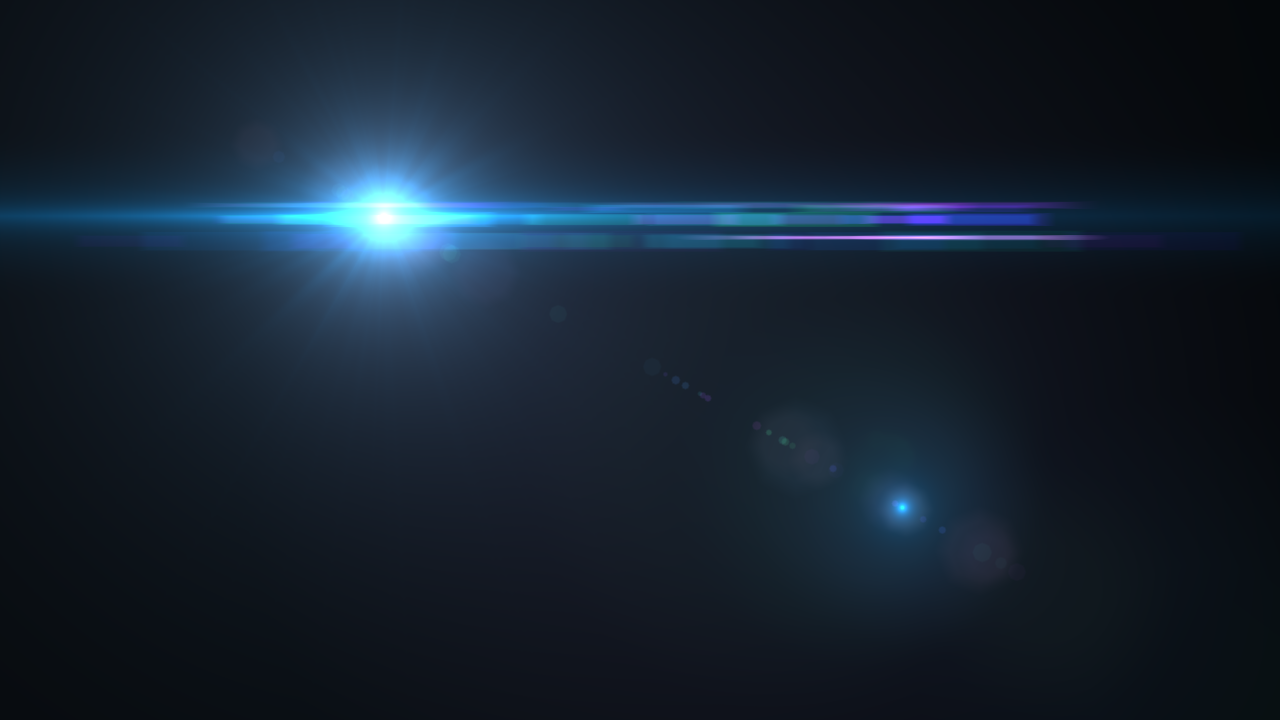
Lens flare commonly associated with the use of anamorphic lenses which are often used in the production of films

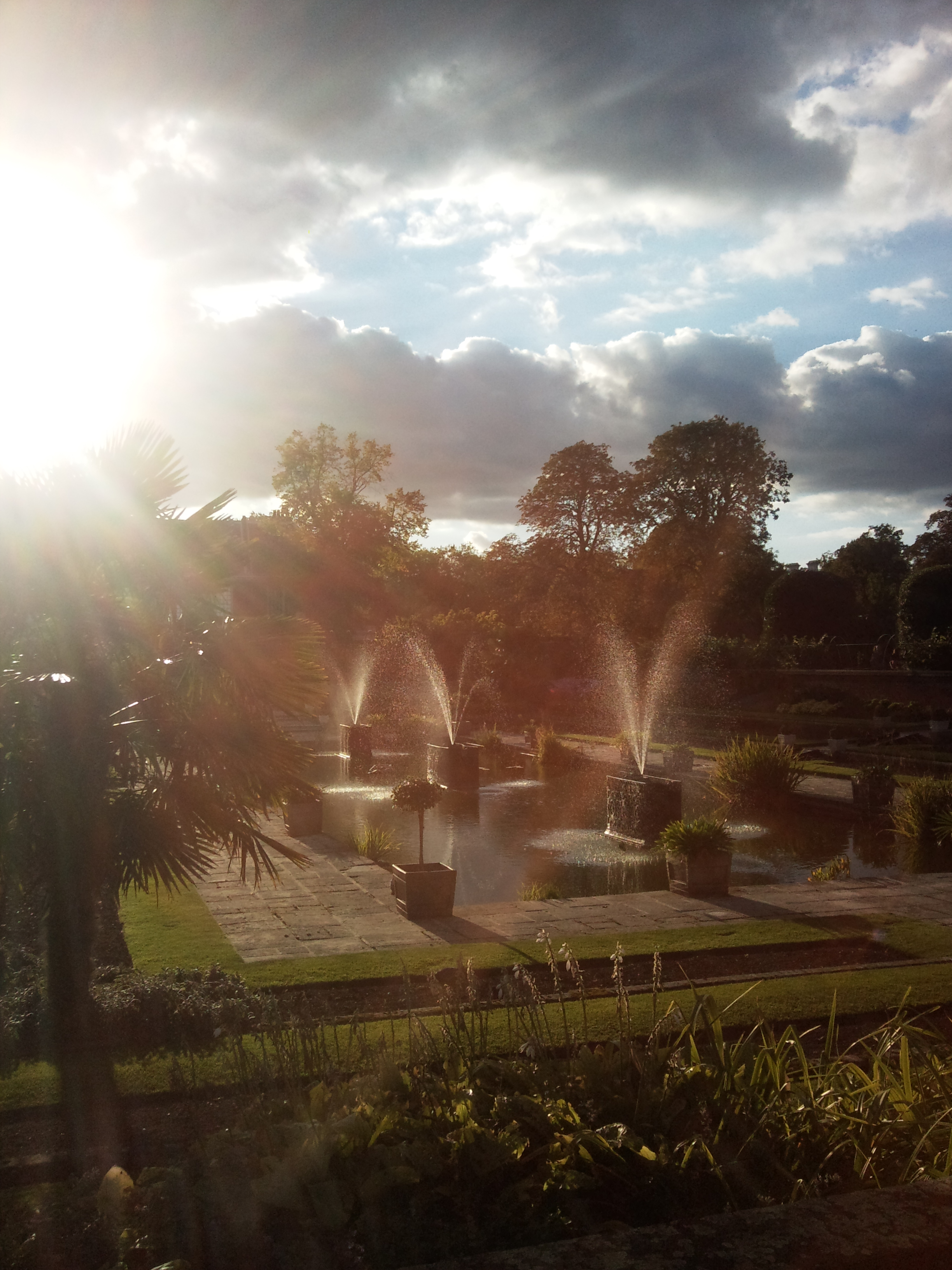
Lens flare example in picture of Kensington Gardens, London, UK

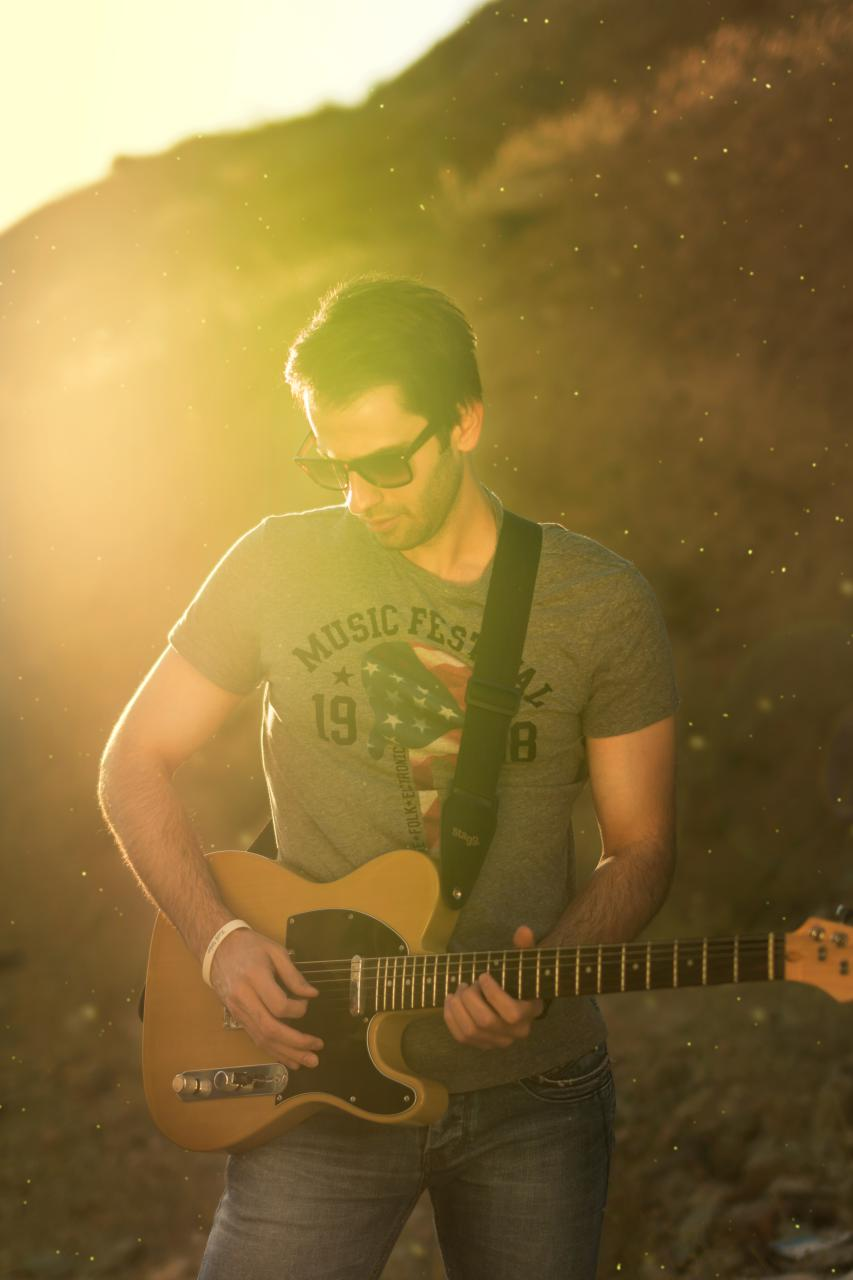
Lens flare example in picture in a portrait. 50 mm at f1.4

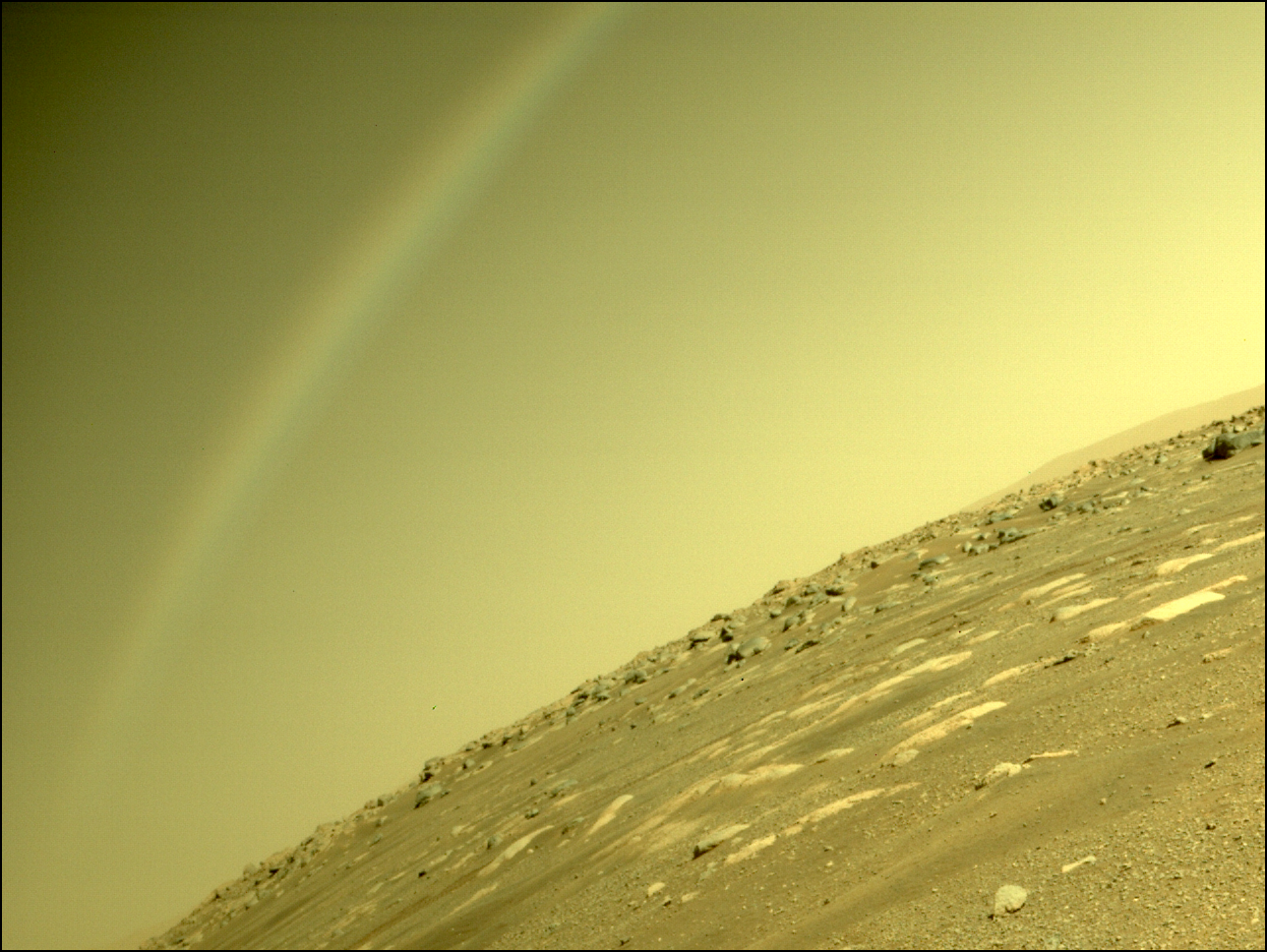
Many mistook an April 4, 2021 lens flare on Mars, which appears in a Perseverance rover photograph, for a rainbow, until NASA clarified the issue.

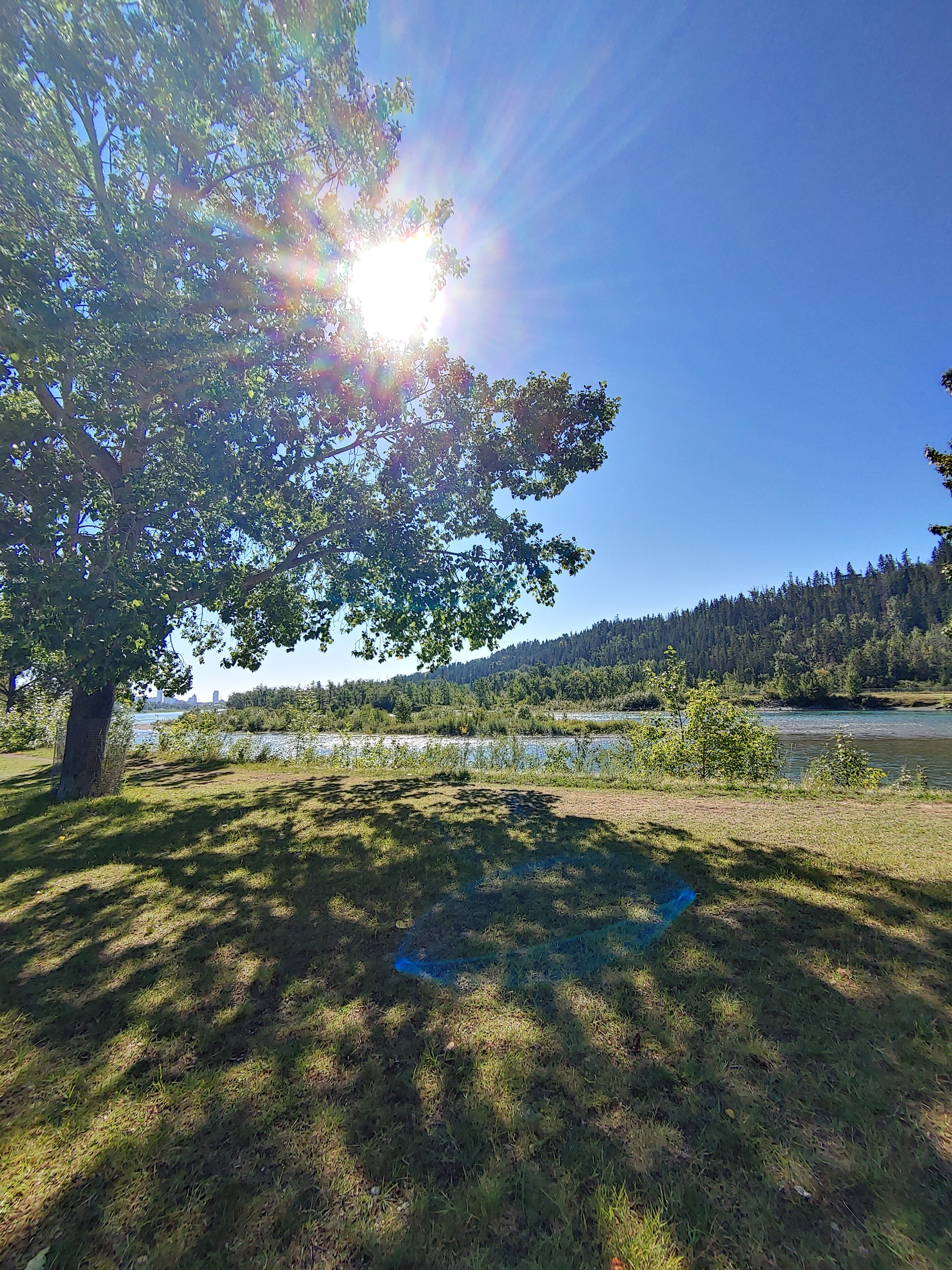
Lens flare in shadow of poplar tree

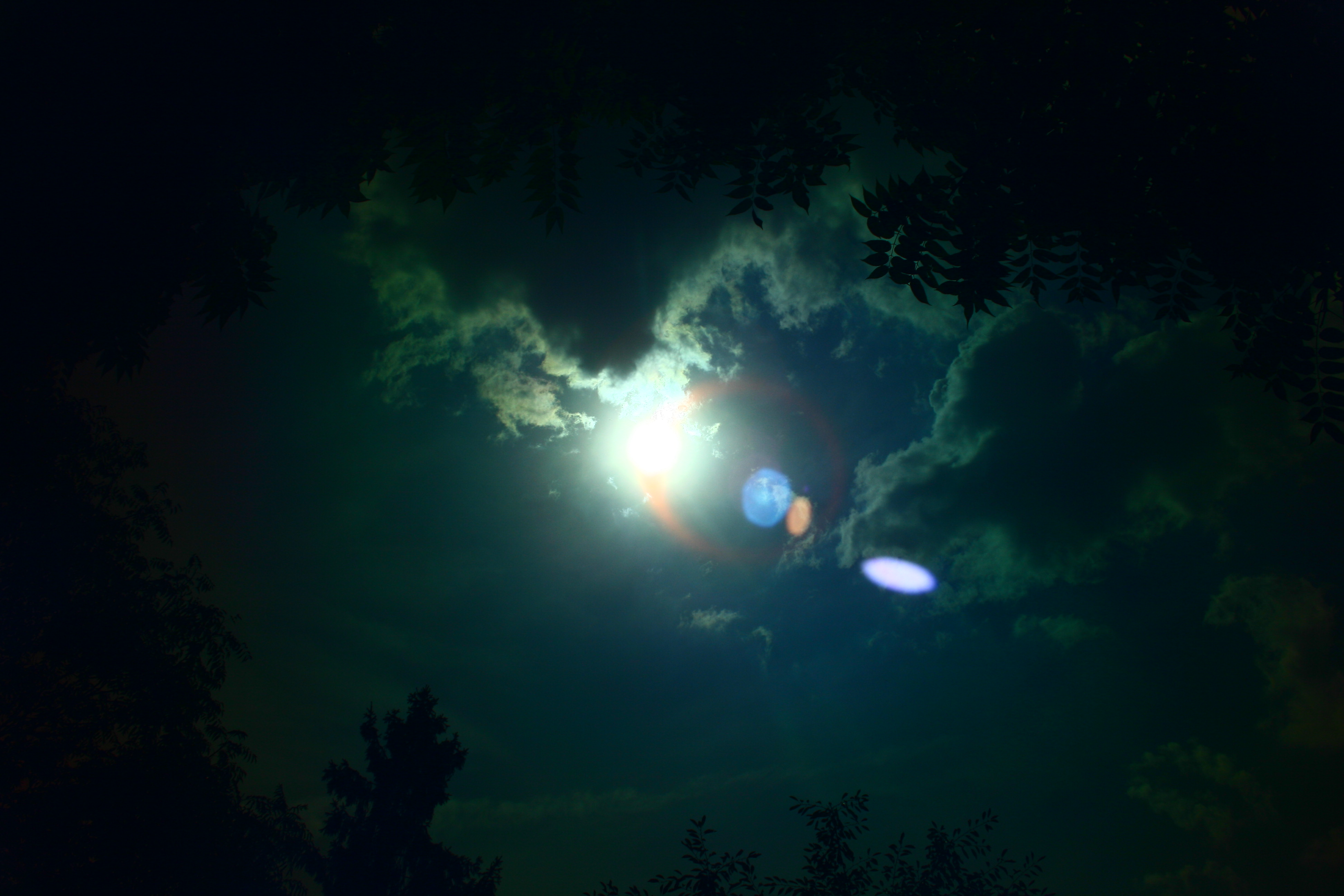
Extreme lens flare caused by intense sunlight

Lens flare in a film clip

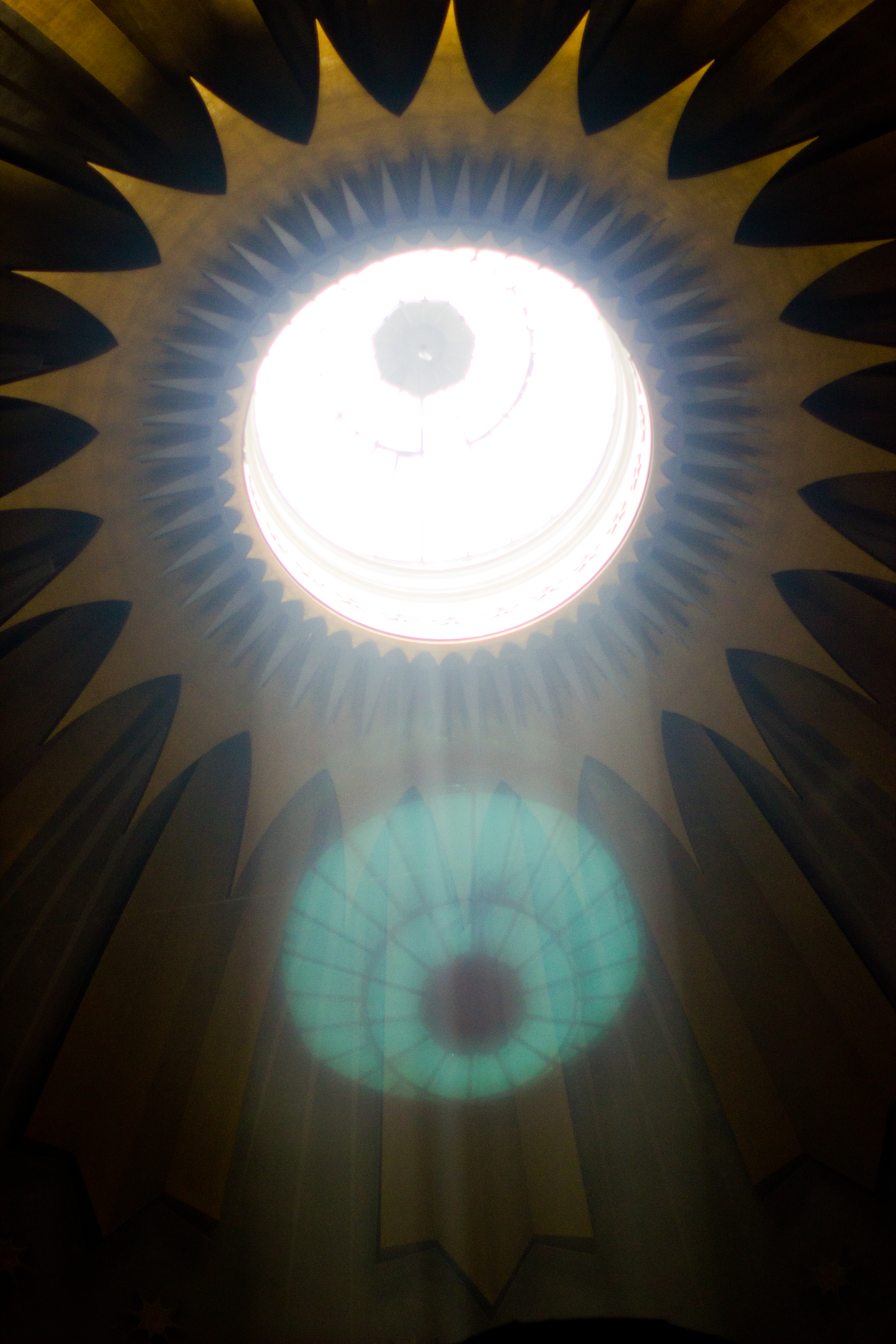
Sensor flare—light is reflected off the sensor to the lens and then back to the sensor

== See also ==
- Anti-reflective coating, used to reduce lens flare and produces the red and green colors common in lens flare.
- Bokeh, a source of circles around out-of-focus bright points, also due in part to the internals of the lens.
- Diffraction spike, a type of lens flare seen in some telescopes
