= Lens cover =

Photography equipment

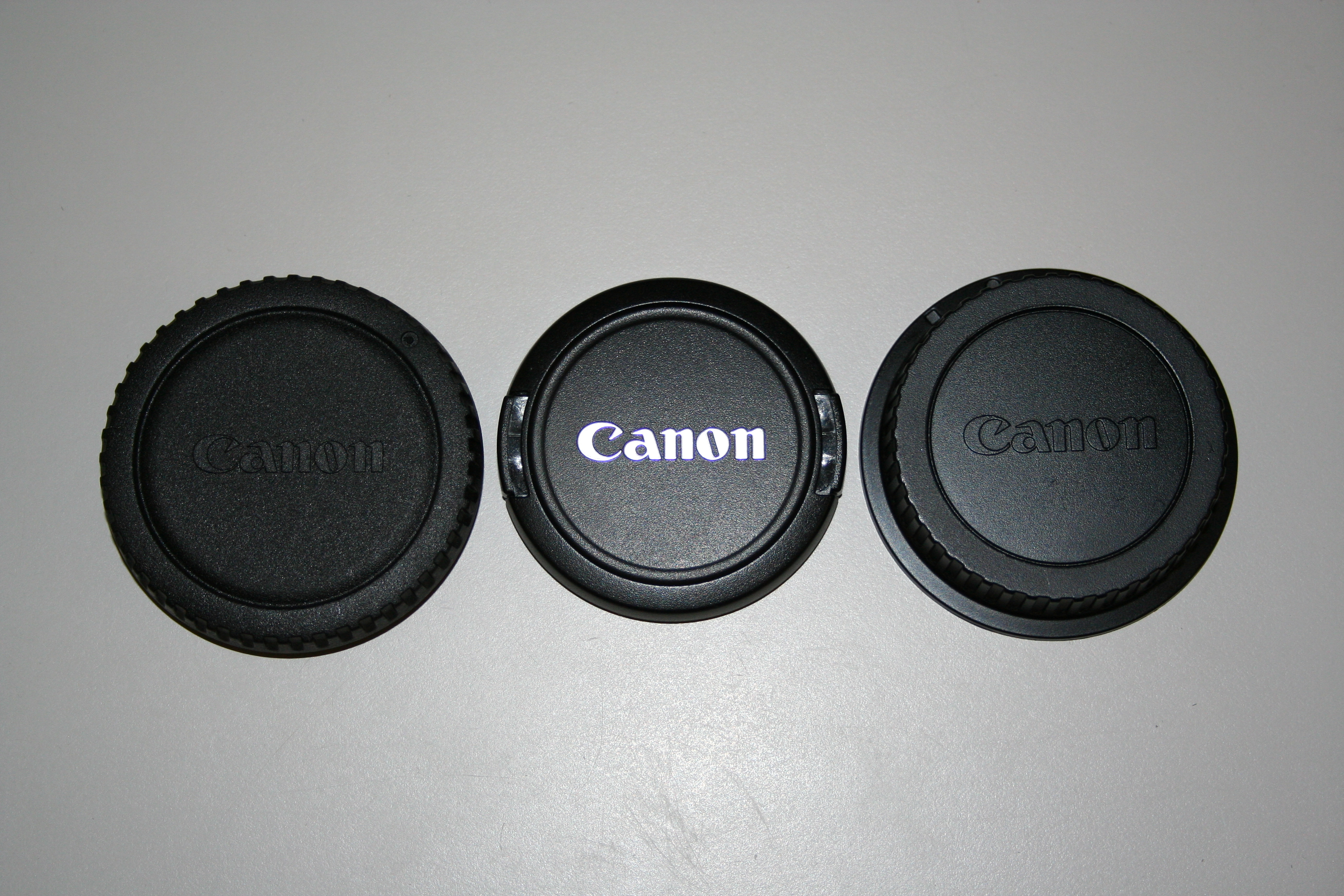
Canon lens covers.

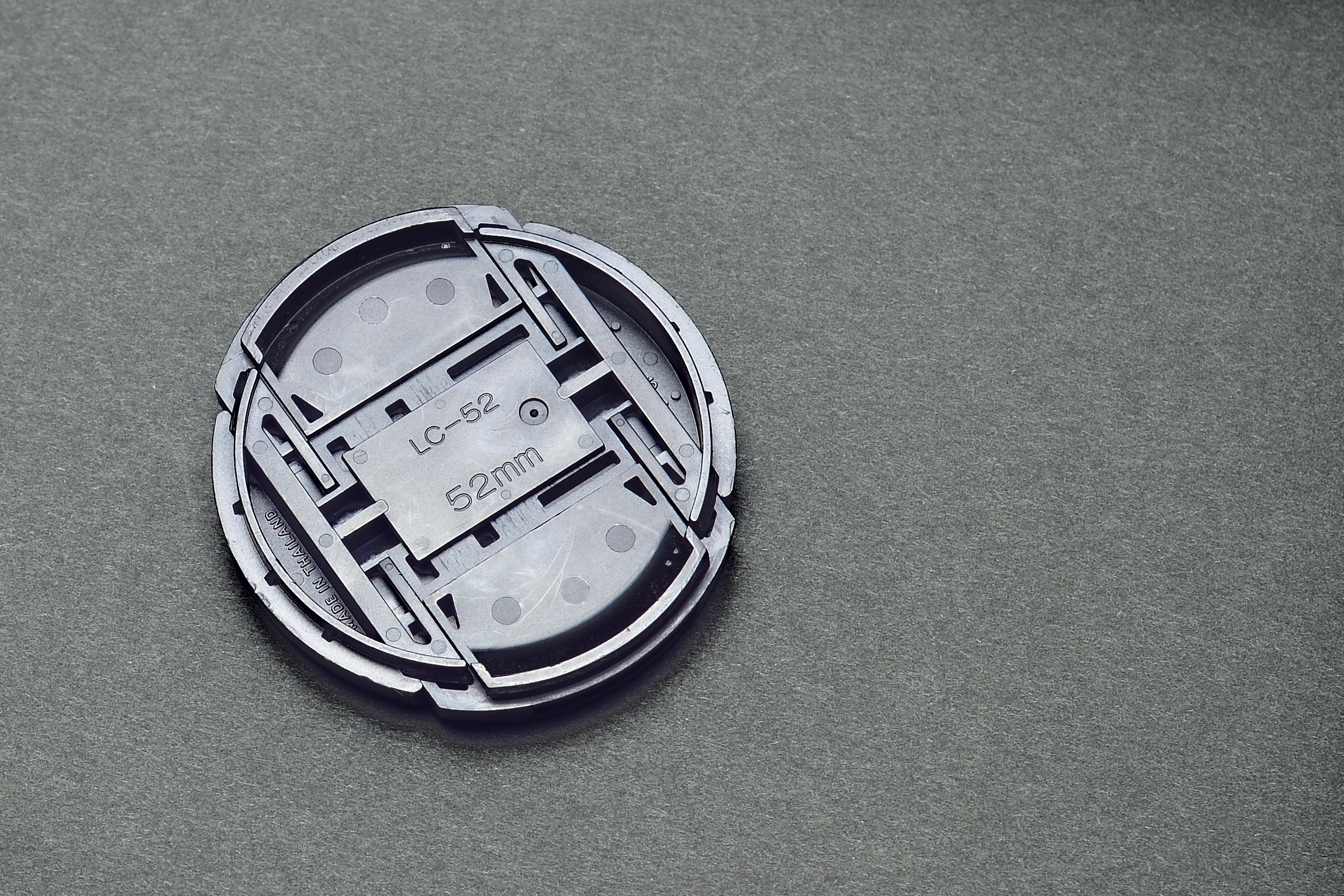
A Nikon LC-52 Snap on Front Lens Cap (back side)

A lens cover or lens cap provides protection from scratches, moisture, and minor collisions for camera and camcorder lenses. Lens covers come standard with most cameras and lenses. Some mobile camera phones include lens covers, such as the Sony Ericsson W800, the Sony Ericsson K750 and the Sony Ericsson K550.

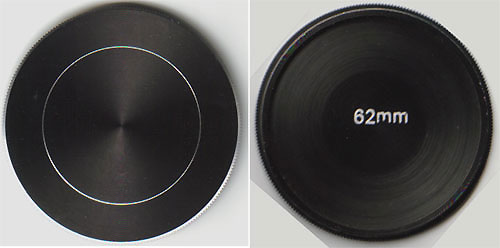
Screw-in metal lens cap

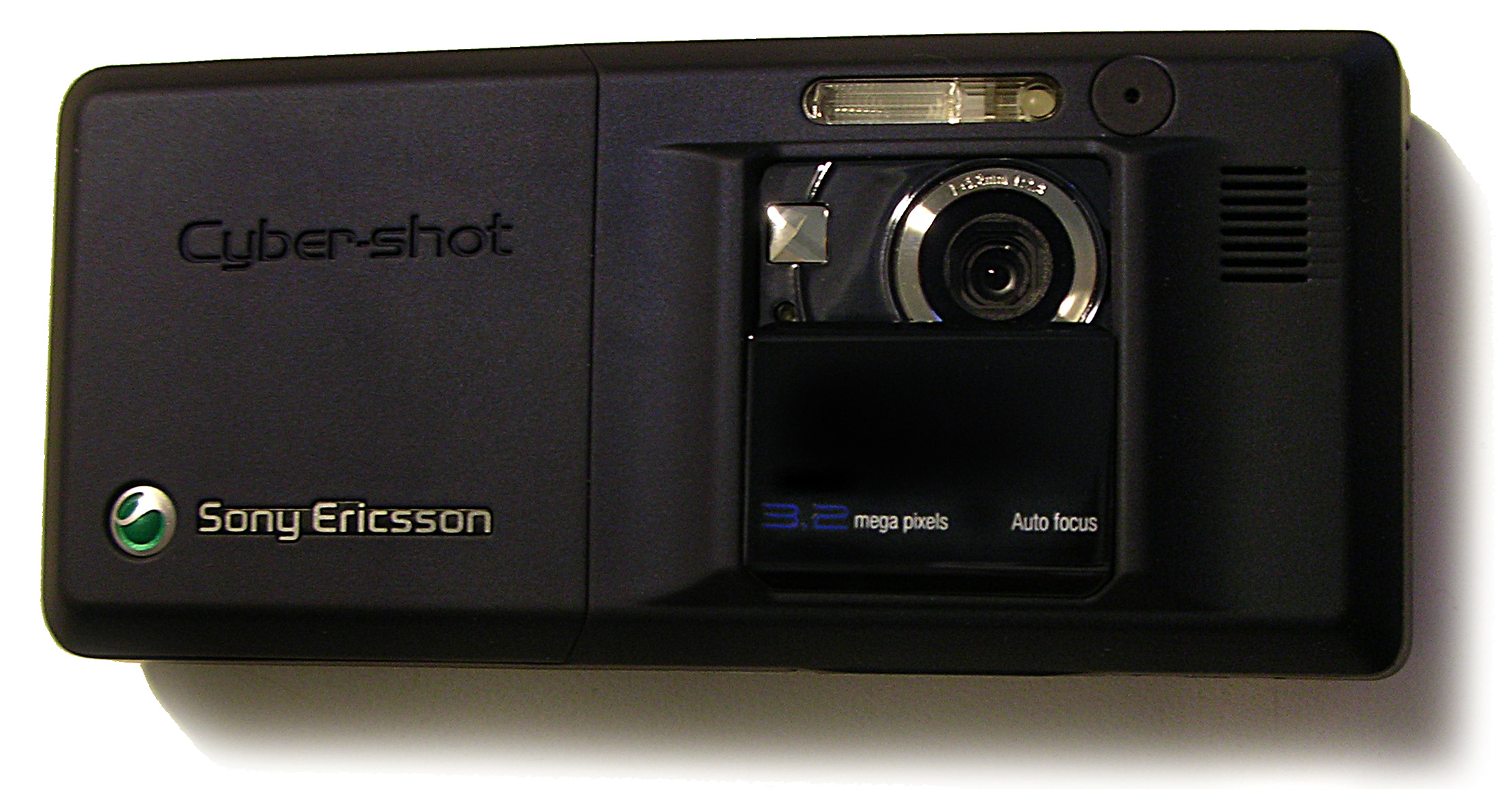
The lens cover as seen on a Sony Ericsson K810i

A more secure lens cap is the metal screw-in lens cap which cannot pop off a lens accidentally. Although a screw-in cap takes more time to remove in order to take a photograph than a standard lens cap, it is stronger than plastic and therefore more protective.

Friction fit lens caps exist but are quite rare.

A lens cap may be tethered to the camera via a string to avoid losing it.

Some cameras (mostly compact cameras) feature an automatic lens cap that opens when the camera is powered on. Many of these use plastic blades and thus offer little protection against damage.

Aside from lens caps, there are also rear caps and body caps, these are used in interchangeable lens cameras and allow protection for the lenses rear element and the shutter/sensor of the camera in storage.

== Non-photographic use ==
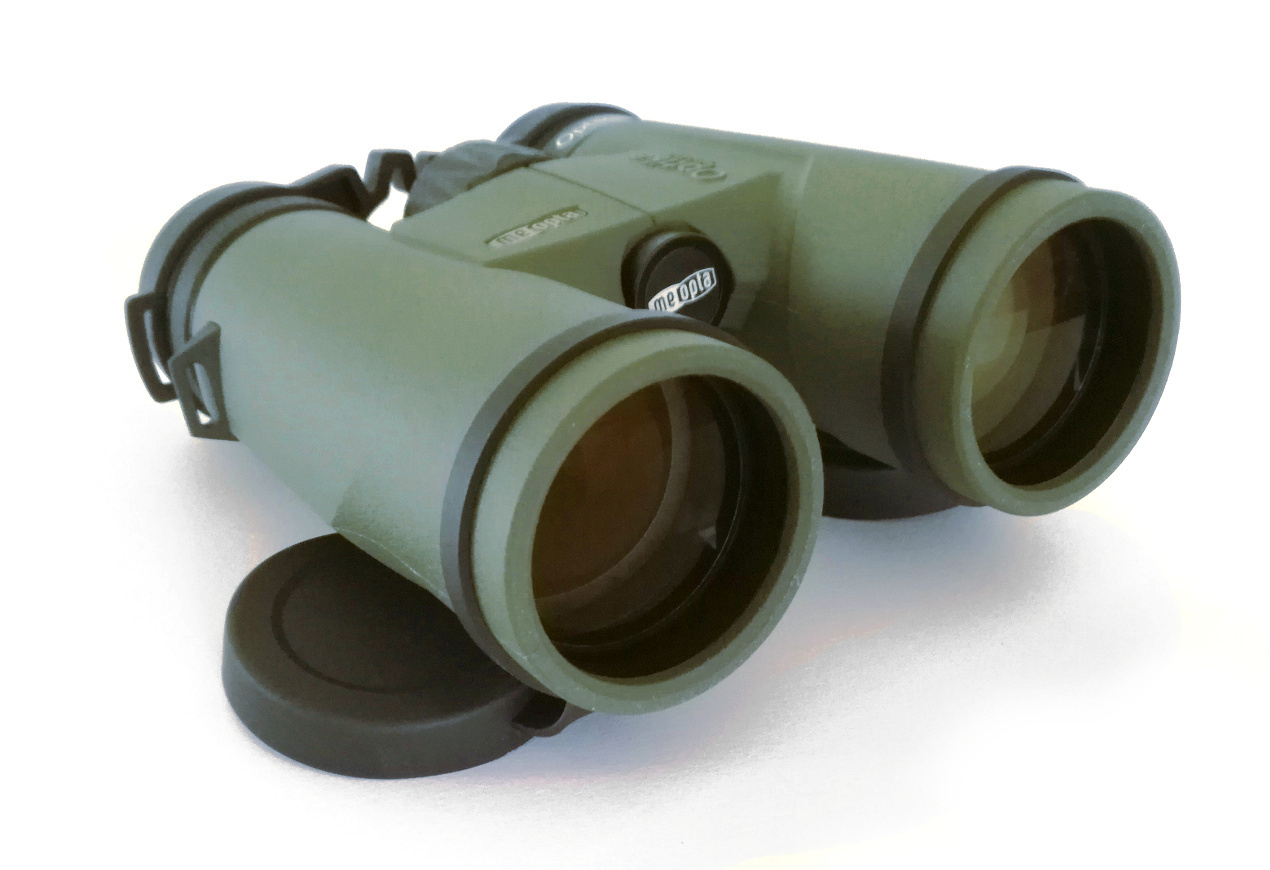
Binoculars with rainguard and opened tethered lens caps

Lens caps are also used in mechanical and/or environmental protection for objective and ocular (outer) lens surfaces in other optical instruments like binoculars or microscopes.

== See also ==
- Lens hood
