= Canon EF 28-70mm lens =

Canon SLR EF mount lens

The Canon EF 28–70mm lens is a family of professional EF mount wide-to-normal zoom lenses manufactured and sold by Canon.

== EF28-70 f/2.8L ==
EF28–70mm f/2.8L USM
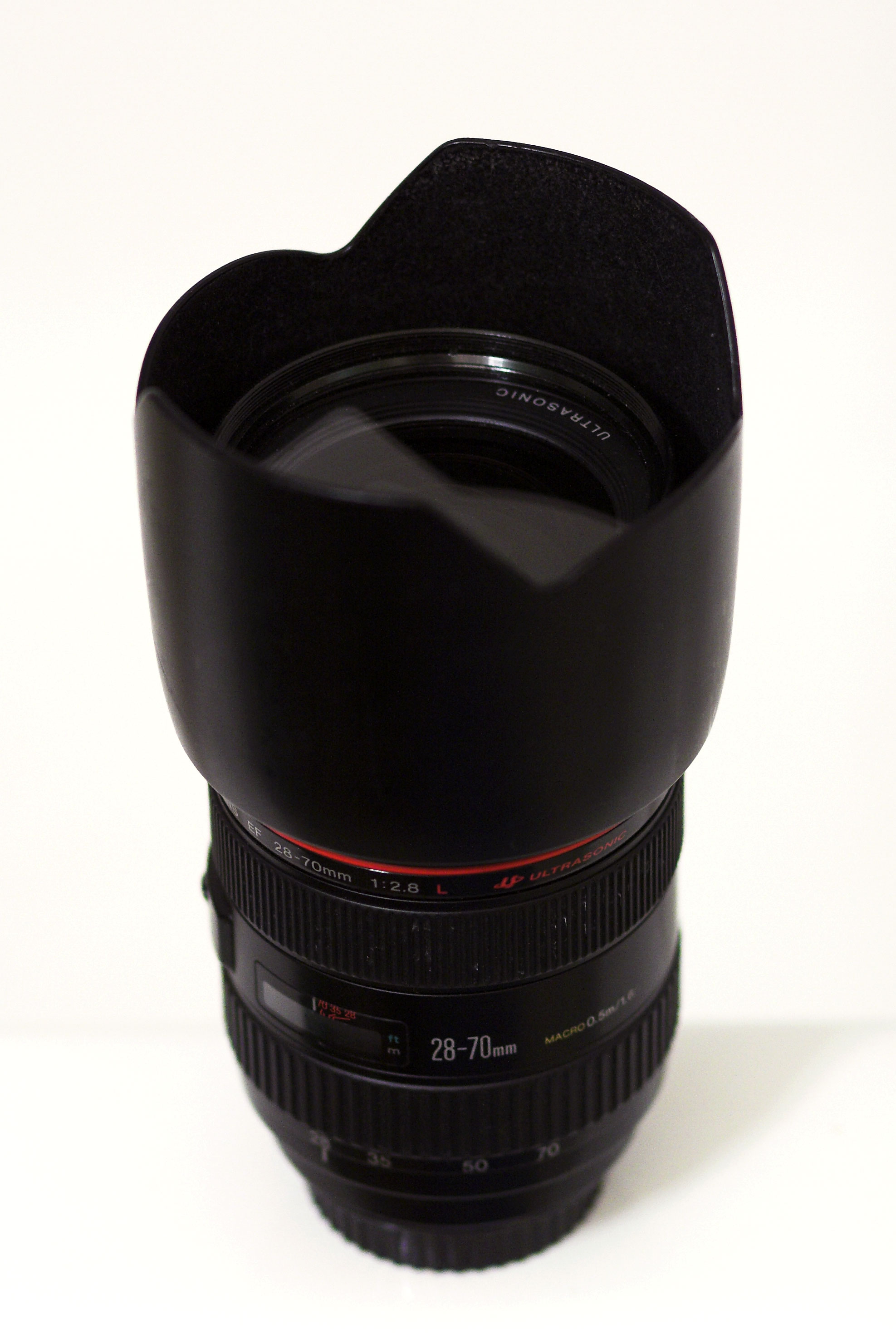
- Maker: Canon

Technical data
- Type: Zoom
- Focus drive: Ultrasonic motor
- Focal length: 28–70 mm
- Aperture (max/min): f/2.8–f/22
- Close focus distance: 0.5 m
- Max. magnification: 0.18
- Diaphragm blades: 8
- Construction: 16 elements in 11 groups

Features
- Short back focus: No No
- Lens-based stabilization: No No
- Macro capable: Yes Yes
- Application: Pro Standard Zoom

Physical
- Max. length: 117.6 mm
- Diameter: 83.2 mm
- Weight: 880 g
- Filter diameter: 77 mm

Accessories
- Lens hood: EW-83B

History
- Introduction: November 1993

The Canon EF 28–70mm f/2.8L USM is an EF mount wide-to-normal zoom lens made by Canon from 1993 to 2002. It was replaced by the 24–70mm f/2.8L USM. The original manufacturer's suggested retail price was ¥180000 (equivalent to ¥204,896 in 2024).

Among standard zoom lenses, it is known for very good contrast and sharpness and for its extremely low chromatic aberration and barrel distortion. It has a metal body and neutral color rendition. Although discontinued since 2002 it is still a high ranking lens according to DxOMark among Canon zoom lenses and other standard zoom lenses. Like many other zoom lenses, it exhibits some barrel distortion at the wide end of its range.

A unique aspect of the 28–70mm f/2.8L USM (and 24–70mm f/2.8L USM) is that its barrel extends as it zooms toward its shortest focal length. When used with the supplied "petaled" lens hood, which attaches to a non-moving part of the lens, this extension results in a properly matched shade at every angle of view. Most zoom lens hoods are designed for only the widest angle of view, offering progressively inadequate shade at longer focal lengths.

== EF28-70 f/3.5-4.5 ==
EF28-70mm f/3.5-4.5
Technical data
- Focus drive: Arc Form Drive
- Aperture (max/min): f/3.5-f/29
- Close focus distance: 0.39 m
- Diaphragm blades: 5
- Construction: 10 elements in 9 groups

Features
- Ultrasonic motor: no
- Lens-based stabilization: no

Physical
- Max. length: 74.8 mm
- Diameter: 70 mm
- Weight: 300 g
- Filter diameter: 52mm

History
- Introduction: November 1987

Retail info
- MSRP: 43000 yen

The EF28-70 f/3.5-4.5 was introduced in November 1987, shortly after the introduction of the EOS system as a whole with the EOS 650. It was Canon's widest EF zoom at the time, until the introduction of the EF20-35mm f/2.8L in 1988. The 28-70 f/3.5-4.5 used a snap-on hood, typical of early EF lenses, which could be reversed for storage. A peculiarity of the design of this lens is that the nose of the lens retracts into the outer lens barrel in the middle of the zoom range, which means the lens cap cannot be mounted when the lens is zoomed to 28 mm or 70 mm.

A second version of this lens, named EF28-70 f/3.5-4.5 II, replaced the original in June 1988. The AF gearing was changed from metal to plastic, and one of the lens elements was replaced with an aspheric element. These changes made the second lens slightly lighter while improving optical performance.

EF28-70mm f/3.5-4.5 II
Physical
- Max. length: 76.5 mm
- Weight: 285 g

History
- Introduction: June 1988

Retail info
- MSRP: 39200 yen

== Canon Standard Zoom Series ==
- Canon EF 28–135mm f/3.5–5.6 IS USM
- Canon EF 17–40mm f/4L USM
- Canon EF 24–70mm f/2.8L USM
- Canon EF 24–105mm f/4 IS USM
