= Canon EF-S 10–22mm lens =

EF-S 10–22mm f/3.5–4.5 USM
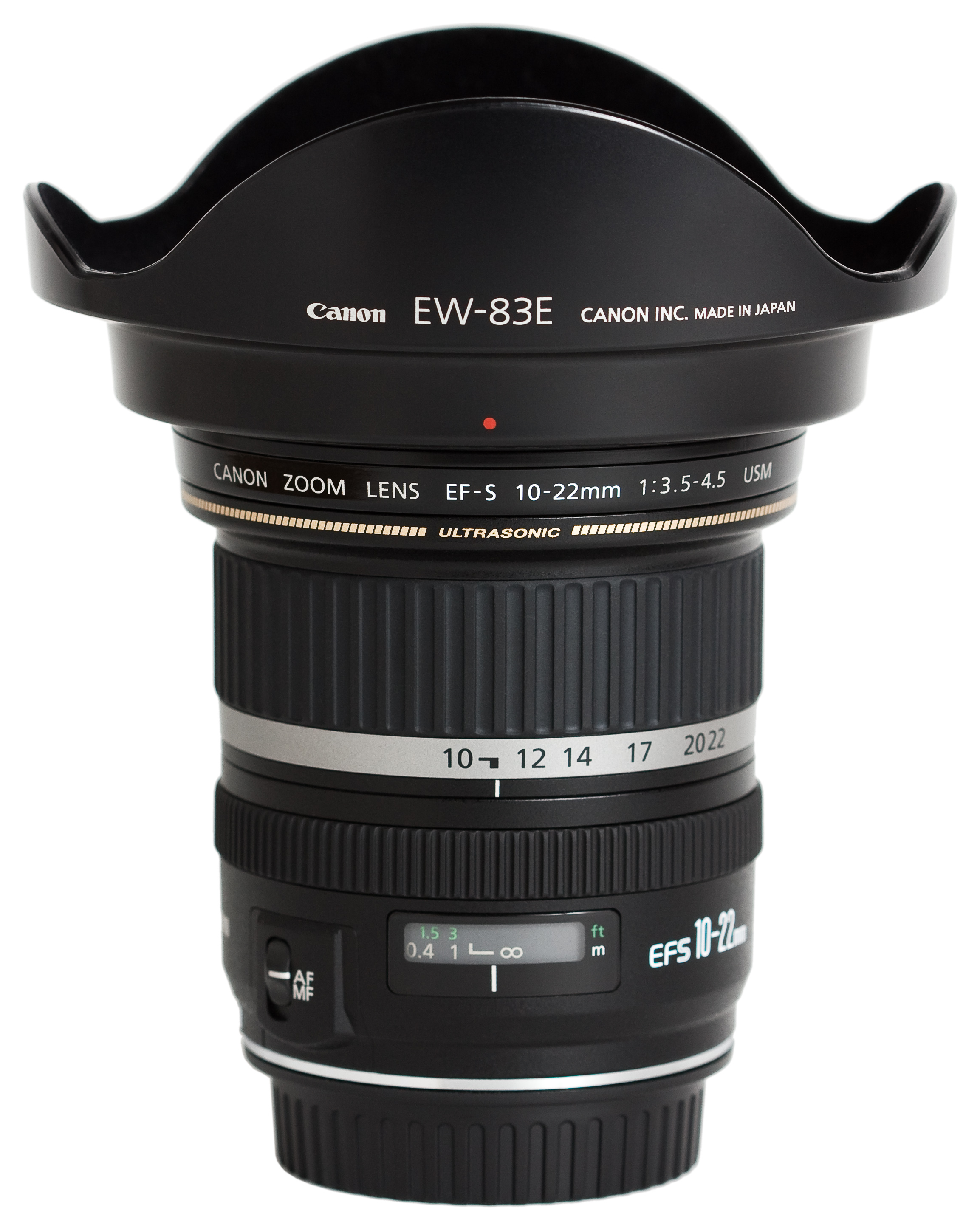
- Maker: Canon

Technical data
- Type: Zoom
- Focus drive: Ultrasonic motor
- Focal length: 10–22mm
- Focal length (35mm equiv.): 16–35mm
- Crop factor: 1.6
- Aperture (max/min): f/3.5–4.5 / f/22–29
- Close focus distance: 0.24 m (0.79 ft)
- Max. magnification: 0.17 @ 22mm
- Diaphragm blades: 6
- Construction: 13 elements in 10 groups

Features
- Short back focus: Yes Yes
- Lens-based stabilization: No No
- Macro capable: No No
- Application: Ultra-Wide Zoom

Physical
- Max. length: 89.8 mm (3.5 in)
- Diameter: 83.5 mm (3.3 in)
- Weight: 385g (13.6 oz)
- Filter diameter: 77 mm

Accessories
- Lens hood: EW-83E, optional
- Case: LP1319, included

Angle of view
- Horizontal: 97°10'–54°30'
- Vertical: 74°10'–37°50'
- Diagonal: 107°30'–63°30'

History
- Introduction: 2004

Retail info
- MSRP: 650 USD

The Canon EF-S 10–22mm f/3.5–4.5 USM lens is a wide to ultra-wide angle zoom lens for Canon digital single-lens reflex cameras with a Canon EF-S lens mount. The field of view has a 35 mm equivalent focal length of 16–35mm, which is analogous to the EF 16–35mm f/2.8L on a full-frame camera. The 10–22mm is an internal focusing lens. Of the 13 elements, one is of Canon's Super Ultra-Low Dispersion glass and three are aspherical elements.

== Reception ==
=== Praise ===
The 10–22 is considered to have good image quality (sharp and low distortion) and build. The optical construction is similar to L-series lenses, but it is not designated as L-series (as reflected in the build quality), which some have argued is for marketing reasons, as with the 17–55.

- "This is an extremely sharp lens, at all three tested focal lengths."
- "There is moderate barrel distortion at 10mm, a negligible amount at 15mm, and only a tiny amount of pincushion distortion at 22mm. Overall, exemplary performance in this measure."
- "This lens is small, light and solidly built. Sometimes Canon's non-L series lenses can feel a bit cheap, but not this one. … there is little to fault about it with regard to either fit or finish."

=== Criticism ===
Cost is the biggest criticism; until fairly recently, the 10–22 cost as much as many L-series lenses, but is only usable on APS-C cameras, and thus is questionable as a long-term investment. Others think this less of a concern.

Chromatic aberration is somewhat high at 10mm, and vignetting is measurable at 10mm and maximum aperture (0.85 EV units), but not terribly noticeable in normal use.

== Use ==
Optimal aperture (for sharpness and to reduce vignetting) is f/5.6 to f/8; f/8 is particularly recommended at 22mm.

Filters exacerbate vignetting, hence thin filters are recommended at 10mm, and stacking filters is discouraged.

== Similar lenses ==
In May 2014, Canon announced a less expensive alternative wide-angle zoom for APS-C bodies, the EF-S 10–18mm. The new lens, which is being sold alongside the 10–22, is slower than the 10–22 (maximum aperture range of f/4.5–5.6) and also lacks a USM motor, but adds both image stabilization and Canon's stepping motor technology. It is also smaller and lighter than the 10–22.

Sigma offers two ultra-wide angle lenses for APS-C sensors—the 8–16 DC and 10–20 DC. Tamron also offers a 10–24mm ultra-wide zoom lens for APS-C cameras as well as an older 11–18mm lens.

In May 2008, "PhotoZone" considered the Tokina 11–16mm, f/2.8, introduced in 2008, to be the best ultra-wide angle lens available for Canon APS-C Format cameras.
