= Canon EF 20-35mm lens =

Canon SLR EF mount zoom lens

The EF 20–35mm lens is a wide-angle lens made by Canon Inc., with an EF mount. There are two models, an L-series f/2.8L and a consumer-grade f/3.5–4.5.

== Table ==
Attribute	f/2.8L	f/3.5–4.5
Image		
Key features
Image stabilizer	No No	
Environmental Sealing	No No	
USM	No No	Yes Yes
L-series	Yes Yes	No No
Diffractive Optics	No No	
Technical data
Maximum aperture	f/2.8	f/3.5–4.5
Minimum aperture	f/32	f/22–27
Filter diameter	72 mm	77 mm
Horizontal viewing angle		
Vertical viewing angle		
Diagonal viewing angle		
Physical data
Weight	570 g	340 g
Max. Diameter x Length	89 mm x 79.2 mm	83.5 mm x 68.9 mm
Groups/elements	12/15	11/12
# of diaphragm blades	8	5
Closest focusing distance	0.5 m	0.34 m
Retail information
Release date	October 1989	March 1993
MSRP ¥	¥190,700	¥77,000

== Successor lenses ==
The 20-35mm lens was followed by two other L-series ultra-wide lenses:

- EF 17–35mm f/2.8L
- EF 16–35mm f/2.8L USM
- The EF 17–40mm f/4L USM is another wide-angle lens that has a similar focal range
