= Canon EF 16-35mm lens =

Camera lens family

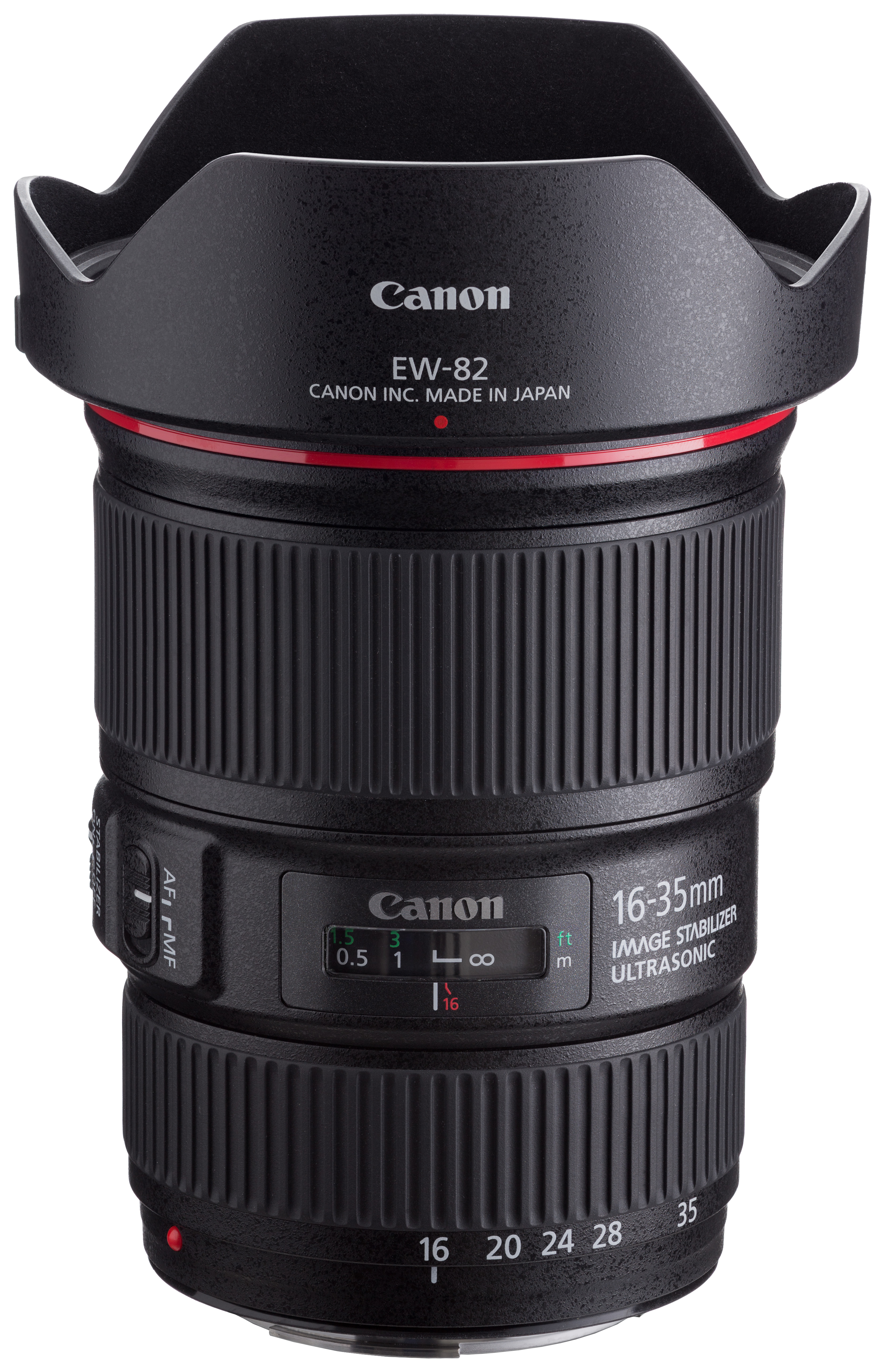
The Canon EF 16–35mm f/4L IS USM lens with its included EW-82 hood

The EF 16–35 mm lens is a family of professional wide-angle lenses made by Canon Inc. The original version, the EF 16-35mm f/2.8L USM, replaced the EF 17-35mm f/2.8L USM lens, which had itself replaced the EF 20-35mm f/2.8L lens.

The lens has an EF mount to work with the EOS line of cameras. Other than the front element, it is sealed against dust and water, and features a diaphragm which remains nearly circular from f/2.8 to f/5.6.

The EF 16-35mm f/2.8L USM was replaced by the EF 16-35mm f/2.8L II USM early in 2007. The main change saw the lens adopt a new optical design featuring 16 elements in 12 groups. Other changes include a 35 g increase in weight, a larger 82 mm filter diameter and a longer length.

The model II lens has garnered favorable to excellent reviews, and has been used in independent feature films like Marianne which was shot using a Canon EOS 7D.

The next member of the family, the EF 16-35mm f/4L IS USM, was announced in May 2014. While it is one stop slower than the other 16–35 mm versions, it is the first L-series wide-angle zoom to offer image stabilization.

Canon announced an upgraded EF 16-35mm f/2.8L III USM in August 2016, with retail availability expected in October of that year. Canon claims that the Mk III version is more durable than the Mk II version, and according to Digital Photography Review, "the Mark III clearly addresses one of its predecessor's largest shortcomings — poor off-center performance".

== Specifications ==
Attribute	f/2.8L USM	f/2.8L II USM	f/4L IS USM	f/2.8L III USM
Image				
Key features
Full-frame compatible	Yes Yes			
Image stabilizer	No No		Yes Yes	No No
Environmental Sealing	Yes Yes		Yes Yes (when using a screw-in filter)	Yes Yes
Ultrasonic Motor	Yes Yes			
L-series	Yes Yes			
Diffractive Optics	No No			
Technical data
Aperture (max–min)	f/2.8–f/22		f/4–f/22	f/2.8–f/22
Construction	10 groups / 14 elements	12 groups / 16 elements		11 groups / 16 elements
# of diaphragm blades	7		9	
Closest focusing distance	0.28 m (0.92 ft)			
Max. magnification	0.22×		0.23×	0.25×
Horizontal viewing angle	98°–54°			
Diagonal viewing angle	108°10'–63°			
Vertical viewing angle	74°10'–38°			
Physical data
Weight	600 g (1.3 lb)	640 g (1.41 lb)	615 g (1.356 lb)	790 g (1.74 lb)
Maximum diameter	84 mm (3.3 in)	89 mm (3.5 in)	83 mm (3.3 in)	89 mm (3.5 in)
Length	103 mm (4.1 in)	112 mm (4.4 in)	114 mm (4.5 in)	128 mm (5.0 in)
Filter diameter	77 mm	82 mm	77 mm	82 mm
Accessories
Lens hood	EW-83E	EW-88	EW-82	EW-88D
Retail information
Release date	September 2001	April 2007	May 2014	August 2016
Currently in production?	No No	Yes Yes		
MSRP US$	$1,939 (230,000 yen)	$1,599	$1,099	$2,199

== Similar lenses ==
EF mount lenses

- EF 11–24 mm f/4L USM – an ultra wide angle lens that provides a wider field of view than the 16-35 mm lenses
- EF 17-35mm f/2.8L USM – replaced the EF 20-35mm lens f/2.8L and was replaced by the EF 16-35mm f/2.8L USM
- EF 17–40mm f/4L – classified as an L-series lens, but is less expensive than any version of the 16–35
- EF 20-35mm f/2.8L – Canon's first wide angle zoom lens, preceded the EF 16-35mm f/2.8L USM
- EF 20-35mm f/3.5-4.5 USM – a consumer-level lens: significantly lower quality and less expensive than the L-series lenses

EF-S mount lenses

- EF-S 10-18mm f/4.5-5.6 IS STM – A consumer-level lens that features image stabilization and stepping motor technology. The 10–18 is less than half the price of the 10–22, and a fourth of the price of the 16–35 mm f/4 IS.
- EF-S 10-22mm f/3.5–4.5 USM – An upper consumer-level lens, more expensive than the EF-S 10-18mm f/4.5-5.6 IS STM
