= Canon EF-S 17–85mm lens =

Camera zoom lens

EF-S 17–85mm f/4–5.6 IS USM
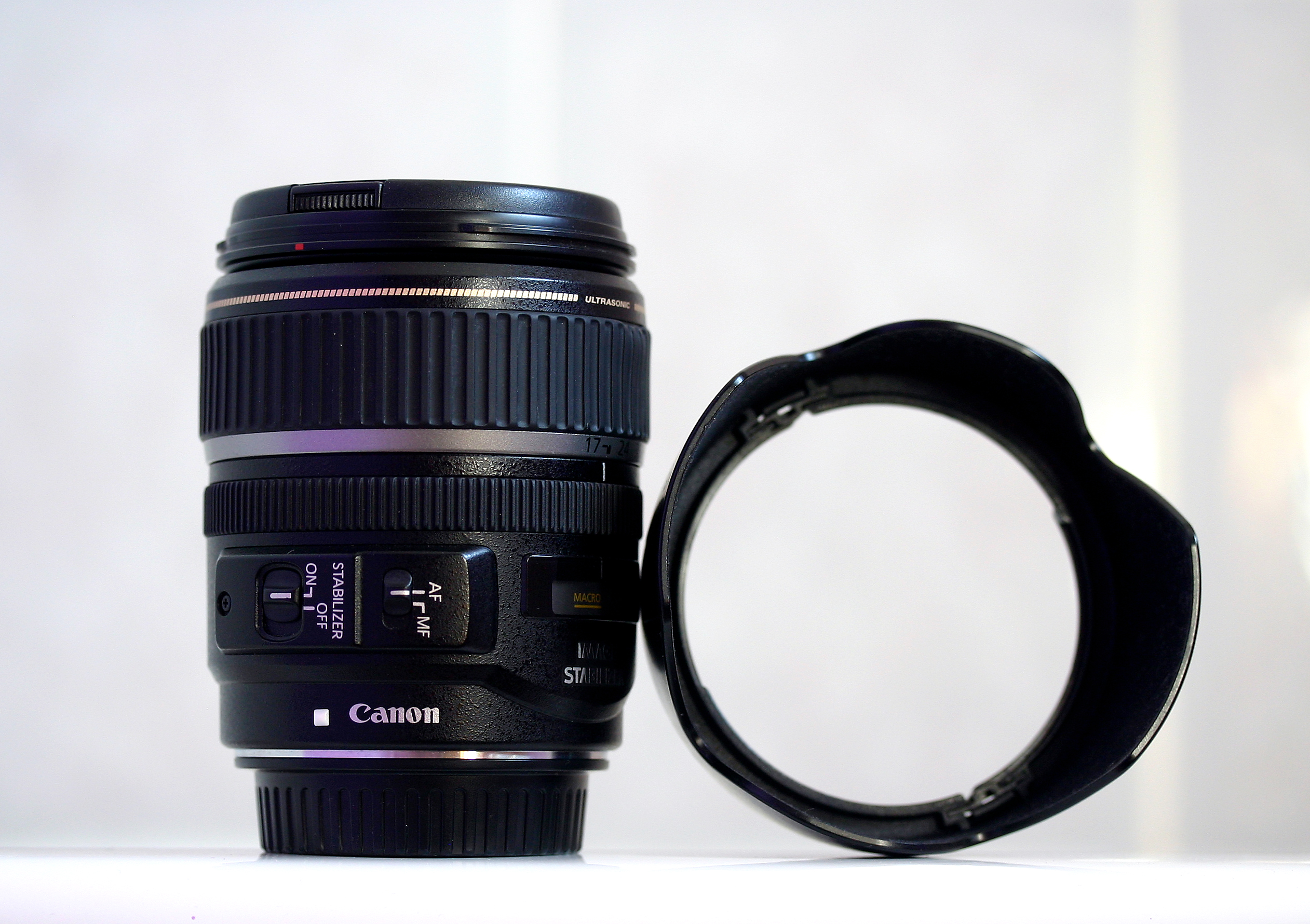
- Maker: Canon

Technical data
- Type: Zoom
- Focal length: 17–85mm
- Focal length (35mm equiv.): 27–136mm
- Crop factor: 1.6
- Aperture (max/min): f/4.0–5.6 / f/22–32
- Close focus distance: 0.35 m (1.1 ft)
- Max. magnification: 0.20××× @ 85mm
- Diaphragm blades: 6
- Construction: 17 elements in 12 groups

Features
- Short back focus: Yes Yes
- Ultrasonic motor: Yes Yes
- Lens-based stabilization: Yes Yes
- Macro capable: No No
- Application: Standard Zoom

Physical
- Max. length: 92 mm (3.6 in)
- Diameter: 78.5 mm (3.1 in)
- Weight: 475 g (1.1 lb)
- Filter diameter: 67 mm

Accessories
- Lens hood: EW-73B
- Case: LP1116 Soft Case

Angle of view
- Horizontal: 68°40'–15°25'
- Vertical: 48°–10°25'
- Diagonal: 78°30'–18°25'

History
- Introduction: September 2004

Retail info
- MSRP: 859.99 USD

The Canon EF-S 17–85mm f/4–5.6 IS USM is a standard zoom lens for Canon digital single-lens reflex cameras with an EF-S lens mount and image stabilization. The EF-S designation means it can only be used on EOS cameras with an APS-C sensor released after 2003. The field of view has a 35 mm equivalent focal length of 27.2–136mm, and it is roughly equivalent to the Canon EF 28-135mm lens on a 35mm film SLR. Despite the word "macro" being present on the lens body (as visible in the infobox image), this lens is not capable of true 1:1 macro photography.

The 17–85mm was bundled as a kit lens with the EOS 30D, EOS 40D, EOS 50D and EOS 60D. It was also packaged with the EOS 400D (known as the Digital Rebel XTi in North America) as an alternate to the EF-S 18–55mm (typically labeled as the "400D enthusiast's kit").

== Similar lenses ==
The EF-S 17–85mm is a step up in build quality and in focal range compared to the EF-S 18–55mm lens. Its image quality is higher than the original and the Mark II versions of the 18–55mm lens. It is slower and has lower image and build quality compared to the EF-S 17–55mm lens, although it is cheaper and has a longer focal range.

The closest lens to the 17–85mm in the standard EF lens range is the EF 28–135mm lens, which has the equivalent range on a full-frame sensor, similar image quality and image stabilization.
