= Sigma 8-16mm f/4.5-5.6 DC HSM lens =

Ultra wide-angle rectilinear camera zoom lens

8–16mm f/4.5–5.6 DC HSM
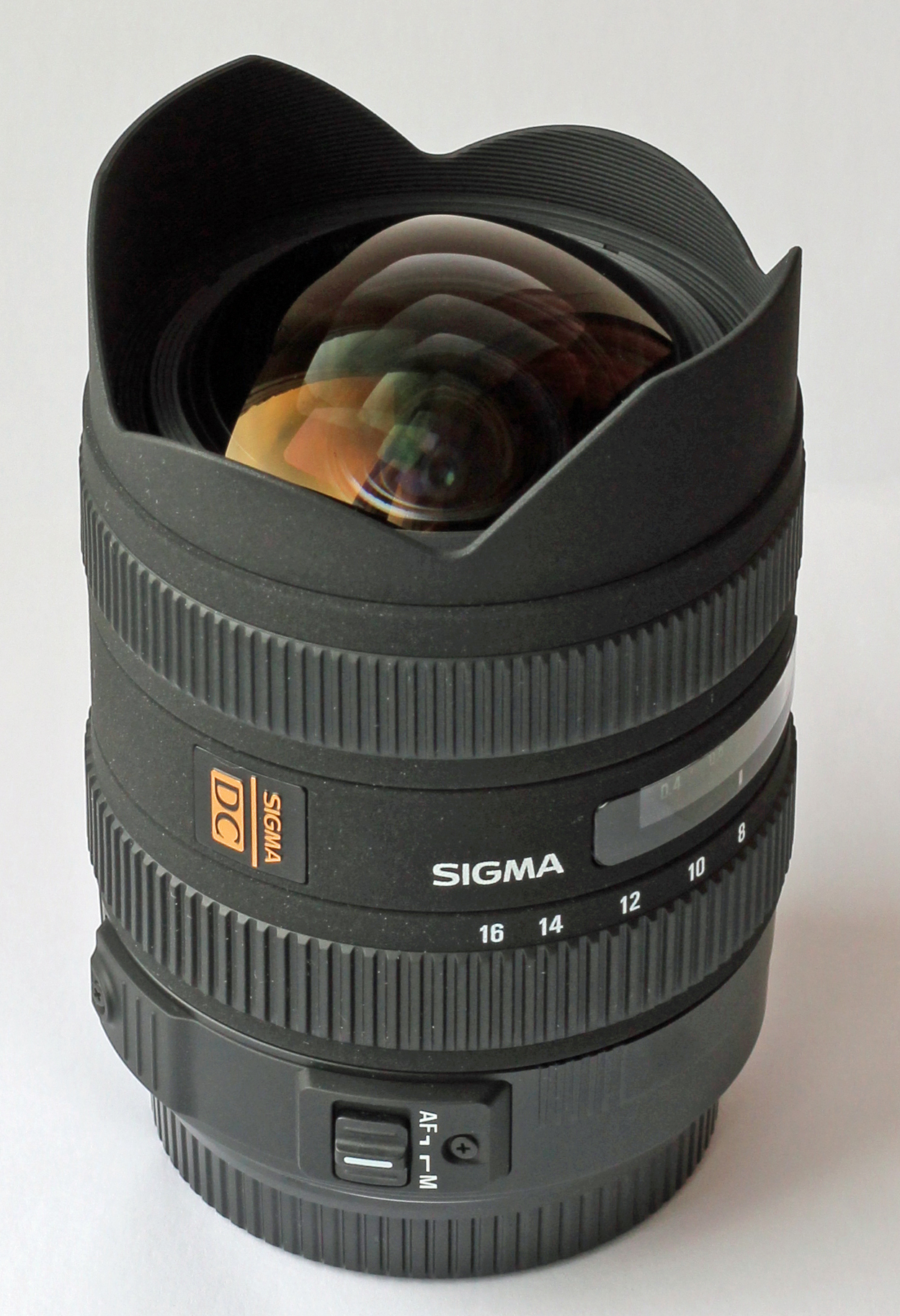
- Maker: Sigma

Technical data
- Focus drive: Ultrasonic motor
- Focal length: 8–16 mm
- Aperture (max/min): f/4.5/22 – f/5.6/29
- Close focus distance: 24 cm (9.4 in)
- Max. magnification: 1:7.8
- Diaphragm blades: 7
- Construction: 15 elements in 11 groups

Features
- Lens-based stabilization: No No
- Macro capable: No No
- Application: Consumer Super Wide-Angle Zoom for Digital SLRs

Physical
- Max. length: 106 mm
- Diameter: 75 mm
- Weight: 555 g (16.4 oz)
- Filter diameter: NA

Accessories
- Lens hood: y

Angle of view
- Diagonal: 114.5° – 75.7°

History
- Introduction: February 2010
- Discontinuation: February 2020

Retail info
- MSRP: 1100 USD

The Sigma 8–16mm lens is an enthusiast-level, ultra wide-angle rectilinear zoom lens made by Sigma Corporation specifically for use with APS-C small format digital SLRs. It is the first ultrawide rectilinear (non-fisheye lens) zoom lens with a minimum focal length of 8 mm, designed specifically for APS-C size image sensors. The lens was introduced at the February 2010 Photo Marketing Association International Convention and Trade Show. At its release it was the widest viewing angle focal length available commercially for APS-C cameras. It is part of Sigma's DC (Digital Camera) line of lenses, meaning it was designed to have an image circle tailored to work with APS-C format cameras. The lens has a constant length regardless of optical zoom and focus with inner lens tube elements responding to these parameters. The lens has hypersonic zoom autofocus.

The lens is sold in versions that fit the bayonet mounts of Nikon, Canon, Sigma, Sony/Minolta and Pentax APS-C cameras. The lens has been discontinued by Sigma Corporation in 2020.

== Specifications and measurements ==
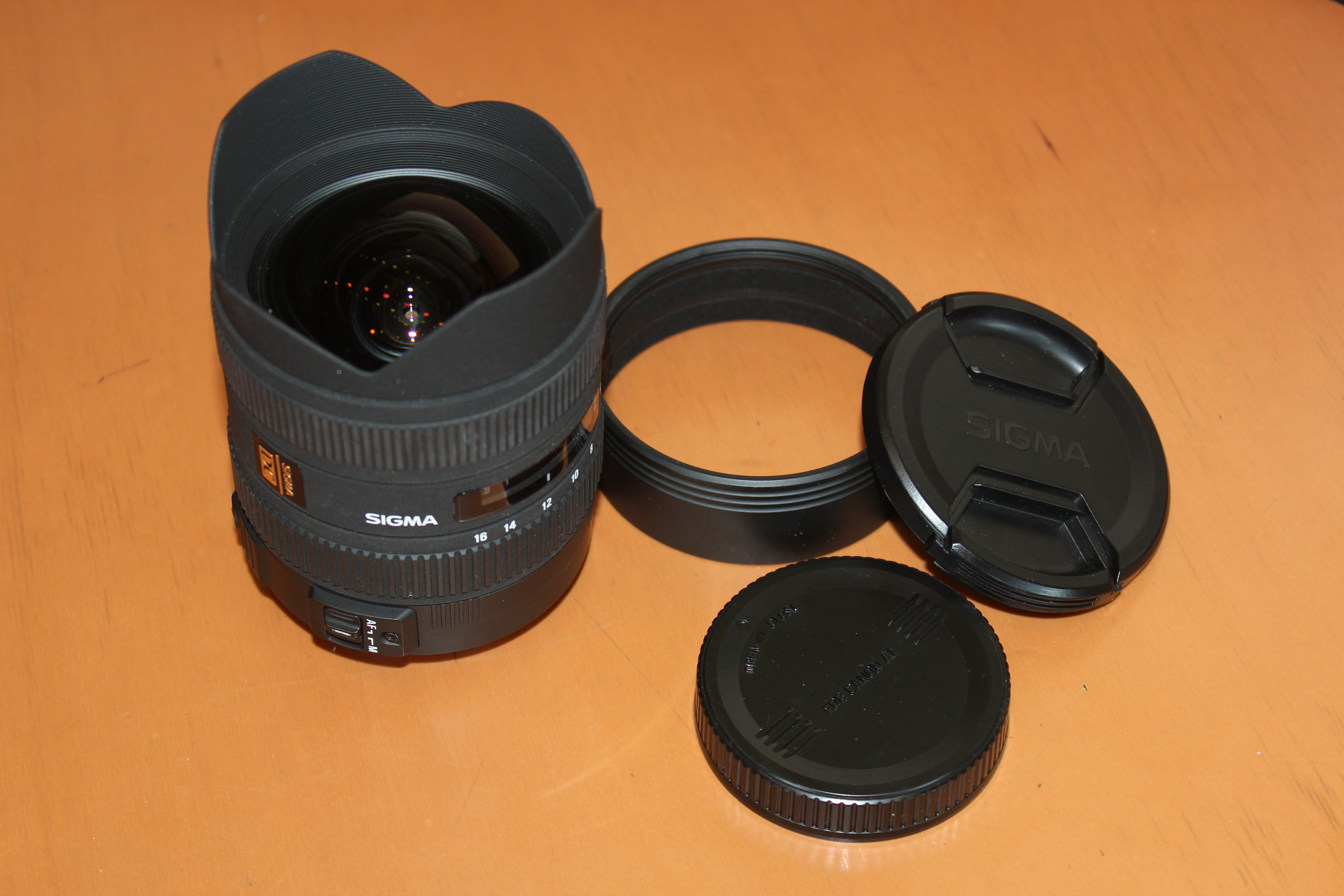
The lens is equipped with a built in lens hood. It comes with a front cap, a ring to mount the front cap and a rear cap.

The lens measures 106 by 75 millimetres (4.2 in × 3.0 in) and weighs 555 grams (1.224 lb). It has a bulb-like aspherical lens, similar to notable wide-angle and fisheye lenses such as the Nikon AF-S NIKKOR 14-24mm f/2.8G ED, Nikon AF DX Fisheye-Nikkor 10.5mm f/2.8G ED, or Tokina AT-X 107 DX AF 10-17mm f/3.5-4.5 fisheye lens. Because of the shape of front element, it is not compatible with many filters, including UV filters, but the frontal exposure is rectified by a petal-shaped lens hood element. Because the lens has a permanent lens hood affixed, it comes with a friction-fit aluminum element, variously described as a sleeve, ring or shroud, that surrounds the hood to enable the placement of a front cap on the lens. PC Magazine's Jim Fisher says the lens is relatively large and heavy; A reviewer at photozone.de says that for a wide-angle lens the dimensions are unusually narrow but long.

The sleeve is threaded, making it compatible with 72mm filters, but vignetting is severe with the sleeve in place. The construction is plastic although the lens' rear mount is metal. The distance meter is recessed inside a window, but no depth of field meter or infrared index is present. The 7/8" zoom ring is made of raised rubber ridges and operates over a 75 degree turning radius. The focus ring is similarly constructed with more closely spaced ridges and a 100 degrees of turning action. The ridges of both rings are parallel to the lens.

The only physical controls on the lens are the AF/MF toggle switch and the two rings, controlling the zoom and focus. The lens does not have image stabilization. This is common for wide-angle photography which can be performed well using hand-held techniques. Over the range of focal lengths, the minimum and maximum aperture vary.

== Autofocus ==
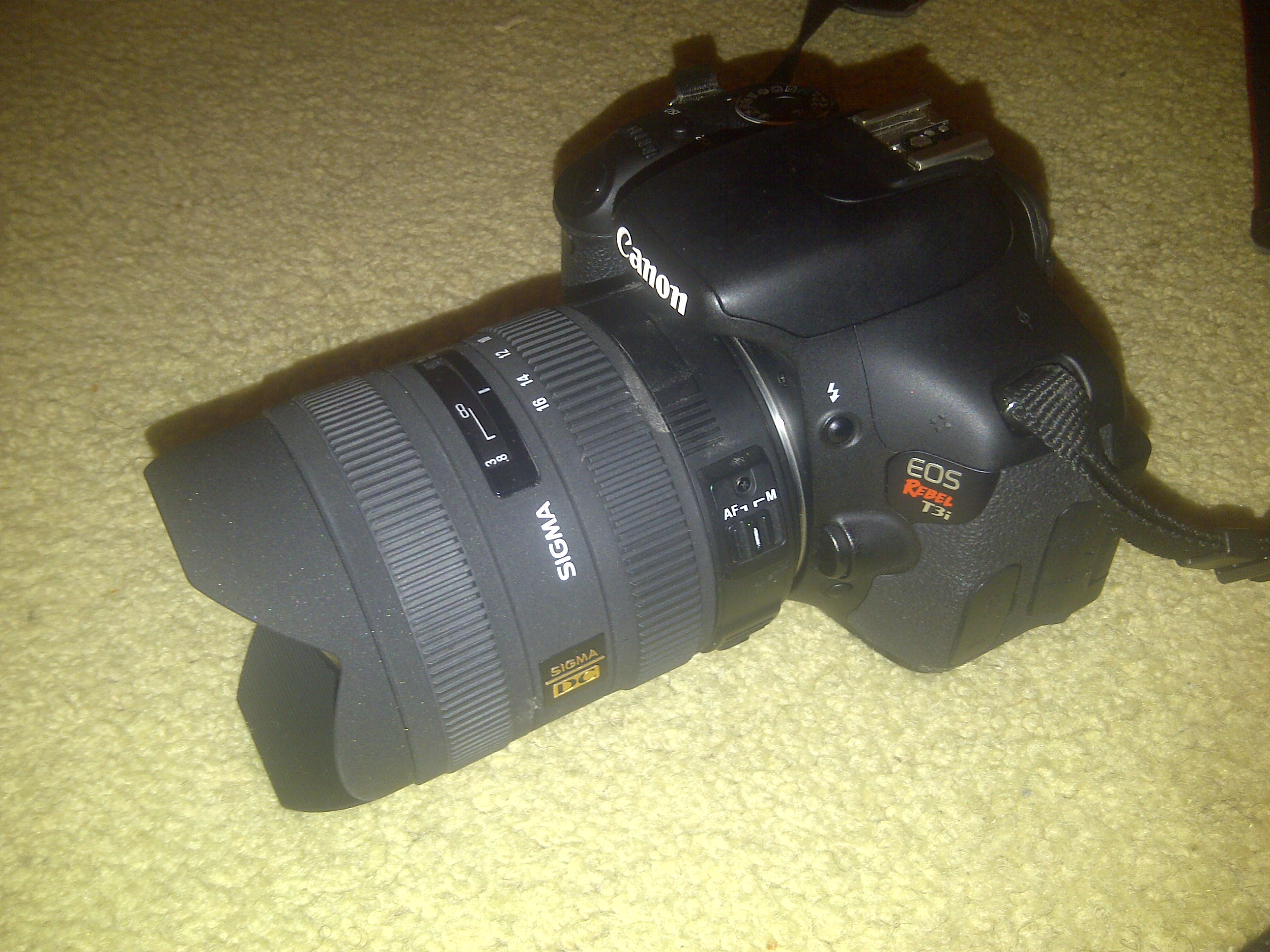
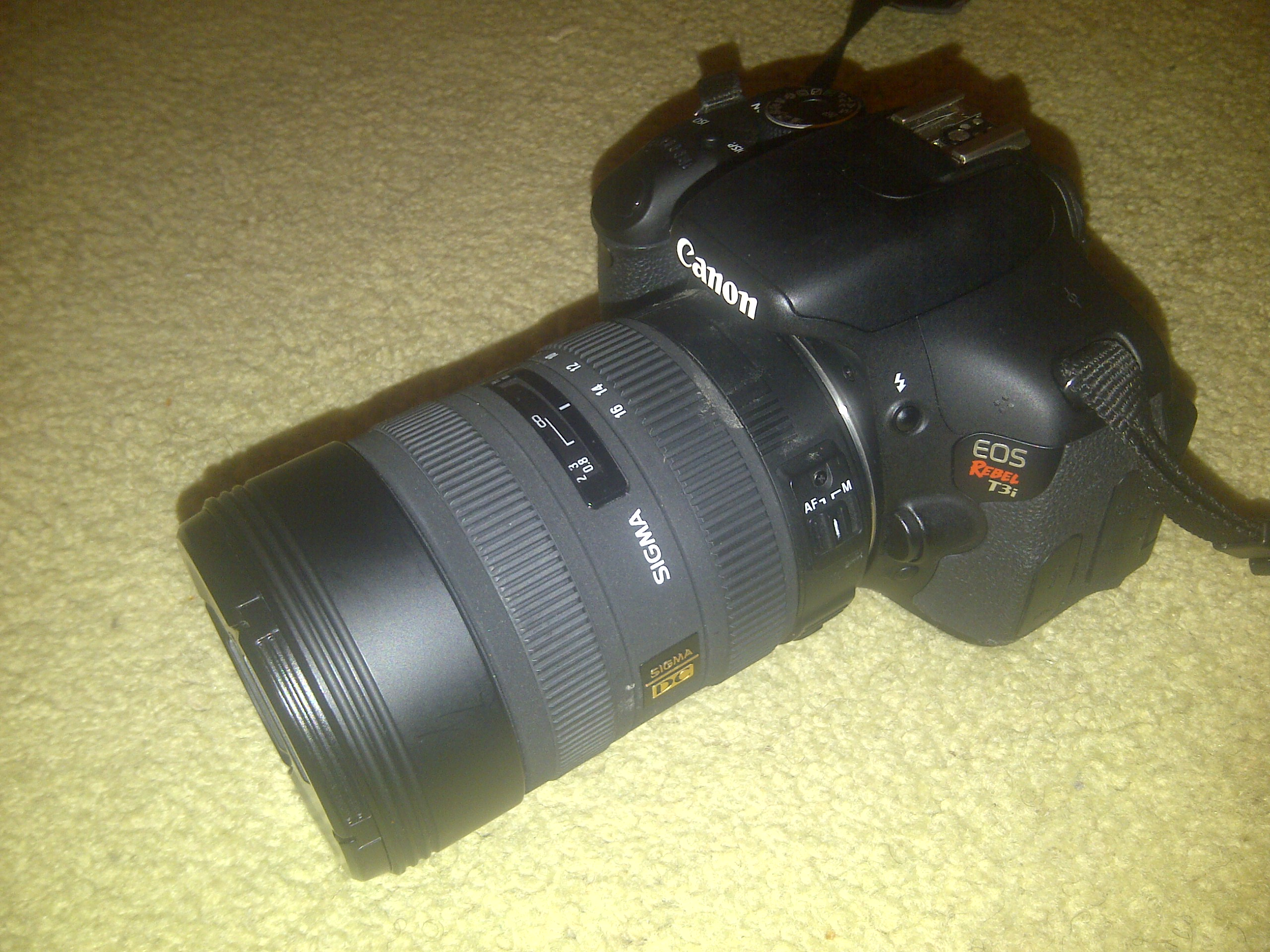
Canon Rebel T3i with Sigma 8–16mm f/4.5–5.6 DC HSM lens. Bottom with sleeve and cap

The lens features a hypersonic zoom motor for its autofocus, which is considered to be a fast and quiet design. In addition, manual override is allowed in the single-shot autofocus mode. The lens, which focuses internally, has one of the lowest maximum magnification measurements in its class (which includes the Canon 10–18mm and 10–22mm, Sigma 10–20mm f/3.5 and Sigma 10–20mm f/4–5.6 EX DC HSM, Tamron 10–24mm f/3.5–4.5 DI II, Nikon 10–24mm f/3.5–4.5G ED AF-S DX, and Tokina 11–16mm f/2.8 AT-X Pro DX lenses). The lens' autofocus feature is not functional with Pentax ist* series and K100D DSLR cameras that do not support hypersonic zoom mechanics. The lens is capable of focusing from infinity to minimum focusing distance and back in under a second: so micro focusing is rapid. However, because of the narrow focus range (0.13x) the lens is not suitable for macro photography.

== Distortion ==
The lens exhibits significant distortion in keeping with the problems of wide-angle lenses. The complex barrel distortion is approximately 2.9% at 8 mm focal length but is fairly insignificant as the focal length is raised above 12 mm, according to Photozone.de. PC Magazine reports 3.1% distortion at 8 mm and 0.7% at 12 mm. It also reports that distortion switches to pincushion distortion of 1.4% at 16 mm. SLAR Gear reports that the point of convergence between barrel and pincushion is about 13 mm. Foreground subjects seem abnormally large compared to similar background subjects with this lens.

By combining the wide angle focal lengths with narrow apertures, the lens provides strong depth of field rather than making blurred backgrounds. The lens is constructed with a hybrid aspherical lens that when combined with two glass mold elements provides excellent correction for distortion as well as astigmatism.

== Vignetting and field of view ==
As all lens systems, natural vignetting (gradual reduction of an image's brightness from the center towards the periphery) is present due to Lambert's cosine law – this becomes more pronounced at shorter focal lengths. Wide open at 8 mm, about 0.75 EVs of shading are apparent at the corners, while at 16 mm only about 0.25 EV of shading is noticeable when comparing the corners to the center. For most of the focal length range of the lens, there is between a half stop and third stop of corner shading. Alternatively, stopping down to higher f-numbers lessens vignetting.

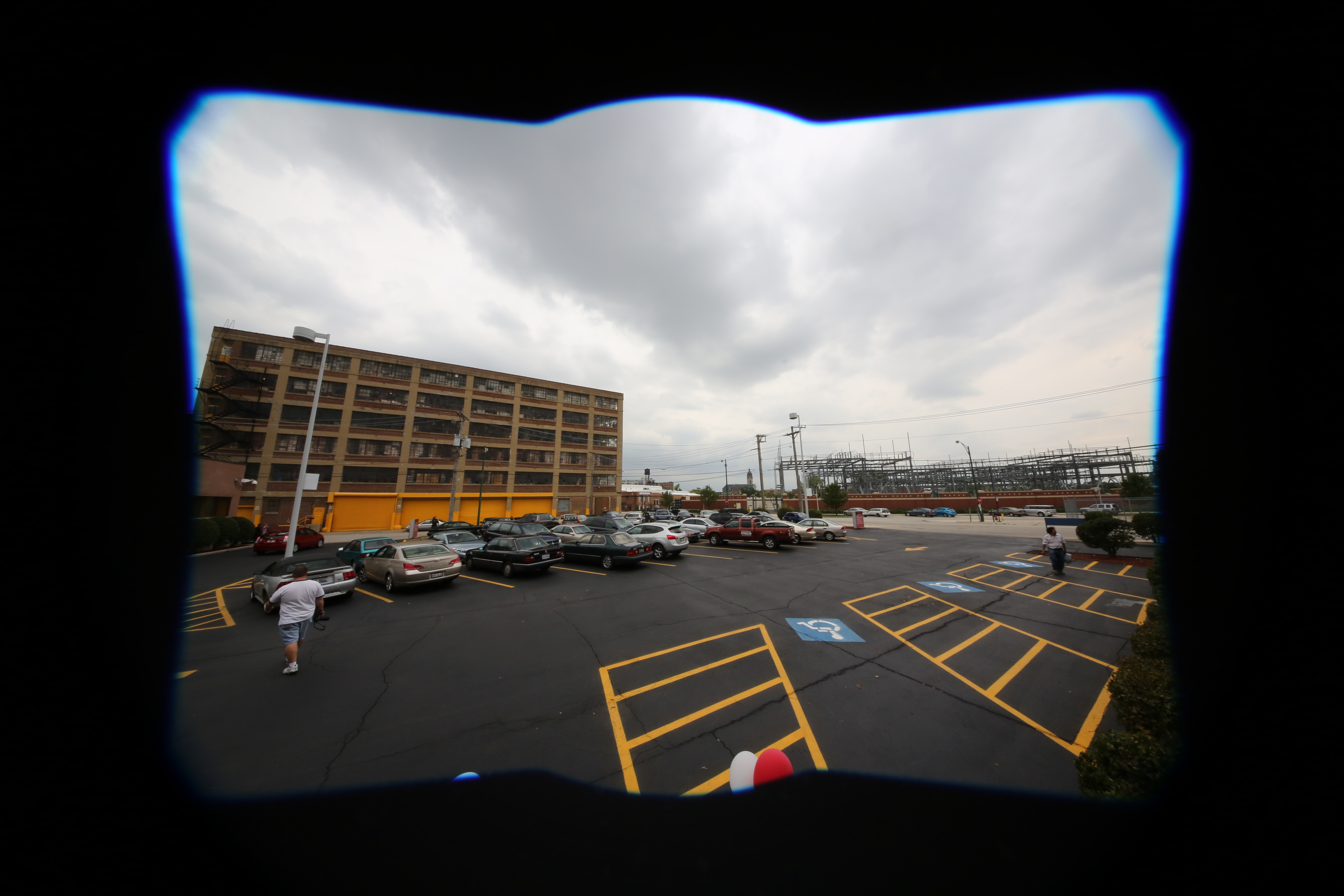
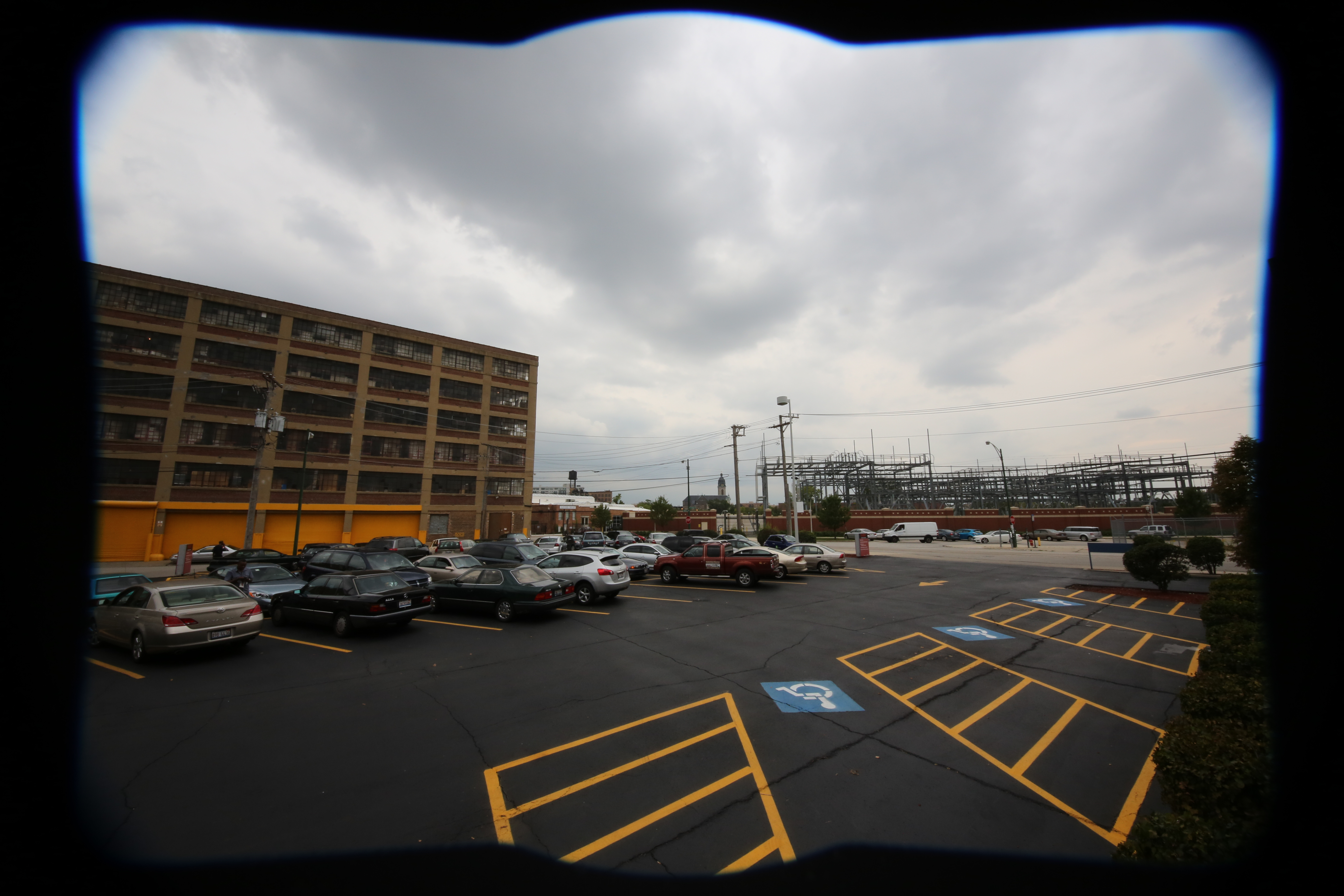
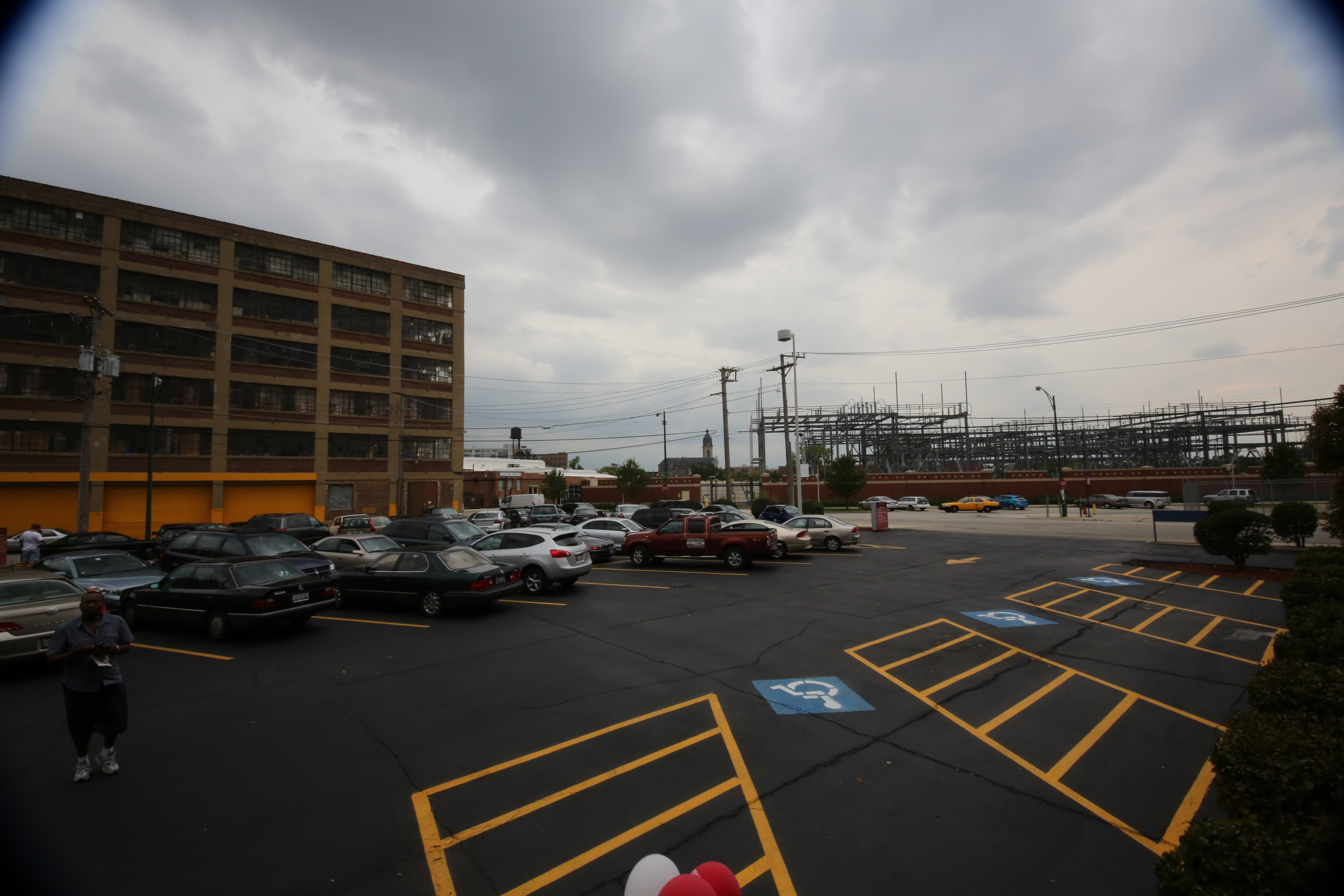
The restriction of the field of view due to the built in lens hood becomes visible on a full-frame digital SLR (left to right: 8 mm, 12 mm and 16 mm focal length).

The lens is equipped with a full-frame digital SLR-compatible mount allowing the usage of both APS-C sized cameras and formats larger than APS-C – the built in lens hood however visibly restricts the field of view (FOV) on formats larger than APS-C – see example above. The FOV in APS-C sized cameras is further restricted at shorter focal lengths if the front cap adaptor ring is not removed – see example below.

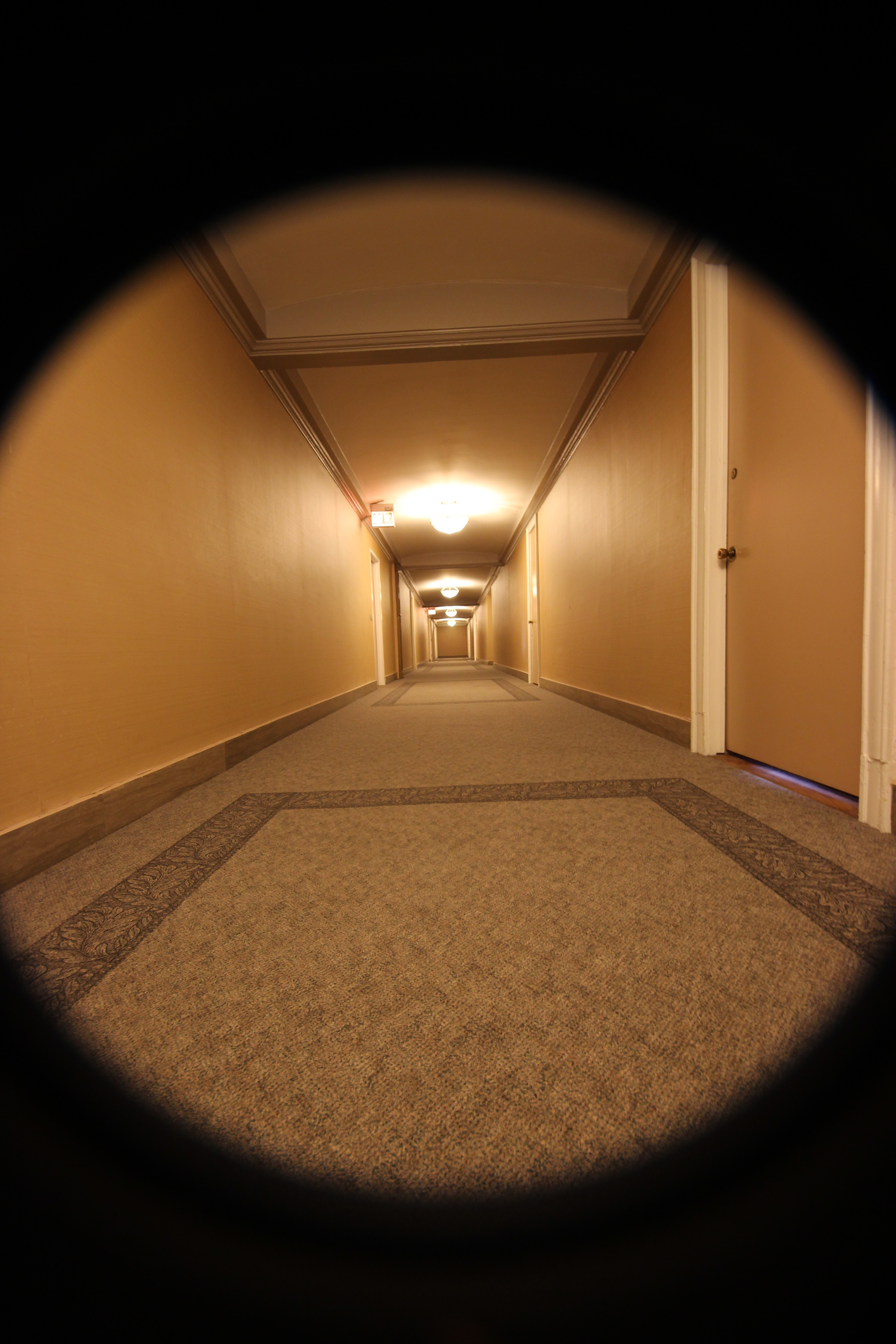
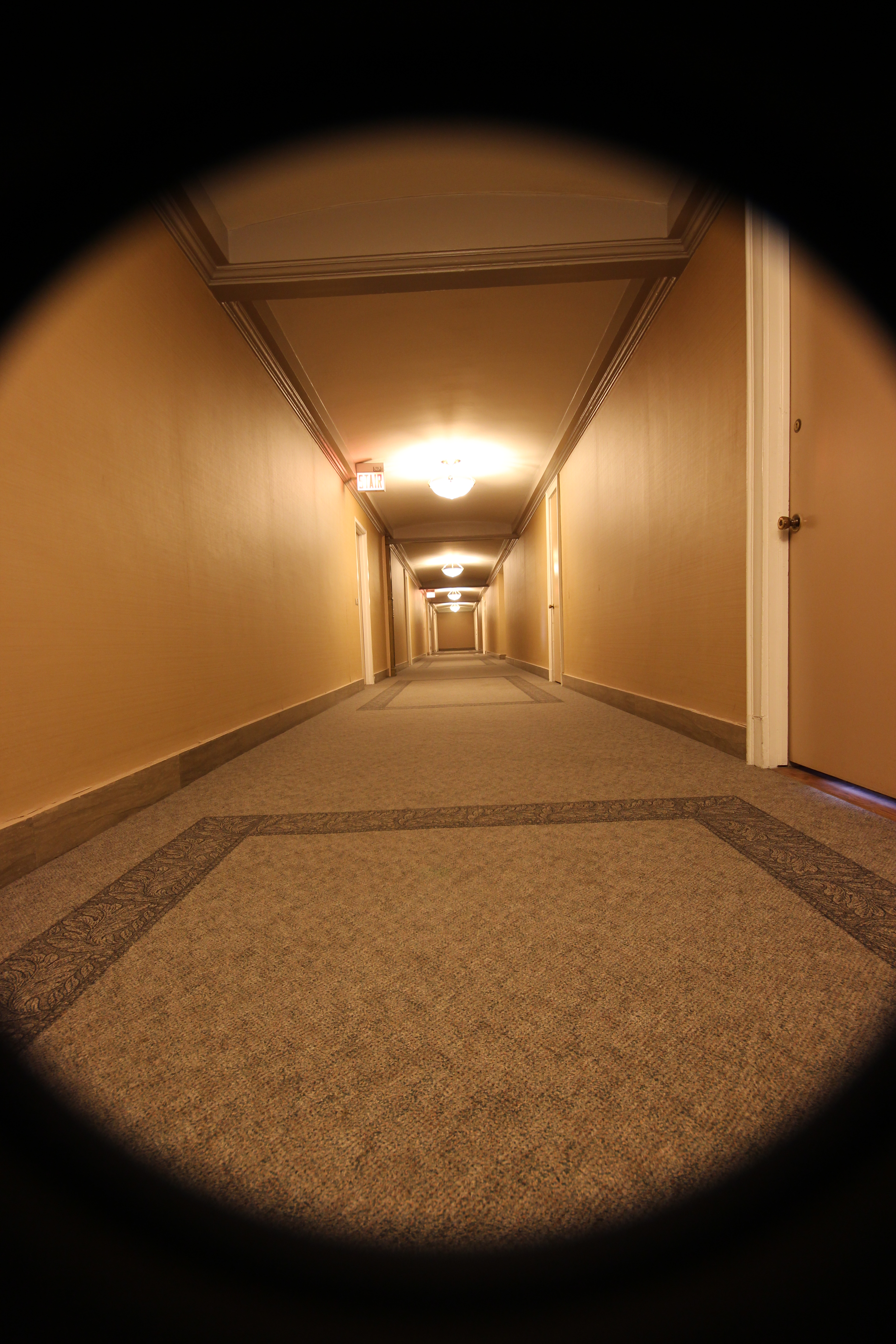
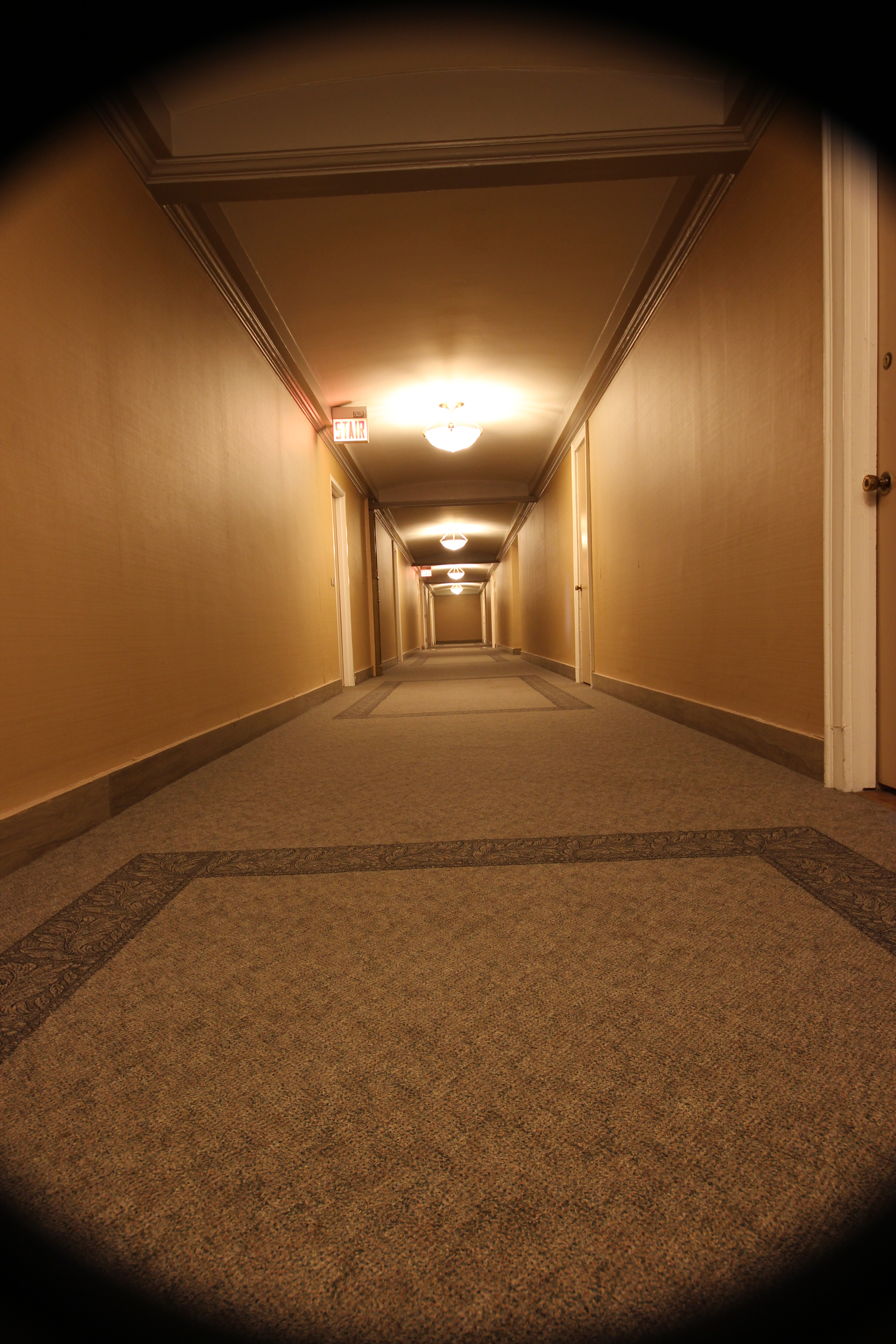
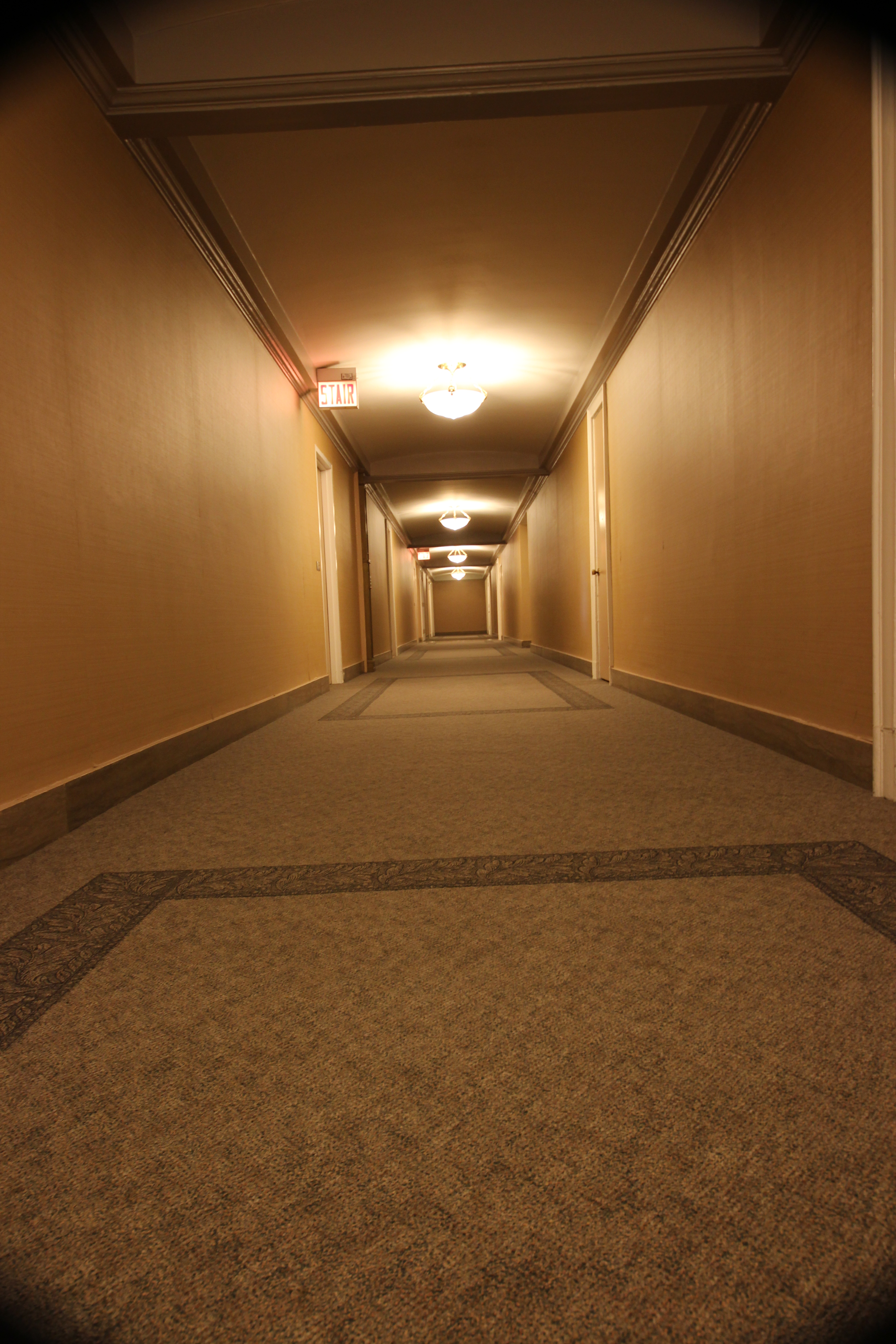
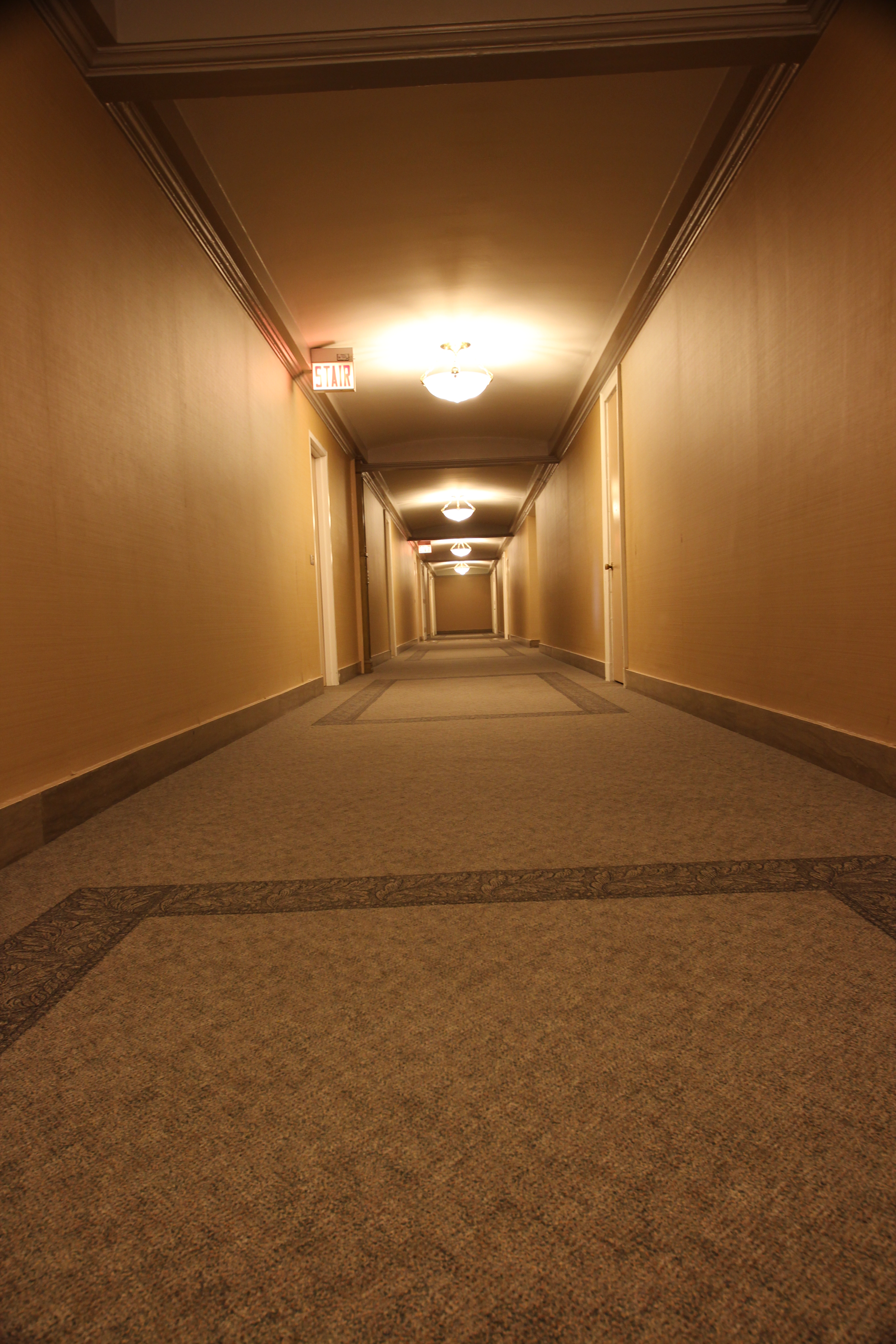
If the front cap adaptor ring is not removed, the field of view becomes restricted even on an APS-C digital SLR camera (left to right: 8 mm, 10 mm, 12 mm, 14 mm and 16 mm focal length).

== Resolution ==
The lens' modulation transfer function (MTF) metrics for its image resolution (sharpness) were described as "surprisingly impressive...throughout the entire zoom range" by Photozone.de. The sharpness, in terms of line widths per picture height (LW/PH), is most uniform at 8 mm (especially near the f-number of 8 where it is even throughout the image) with strong numbers at the center, borders and corner. Higher focal lengths were less impressive. Optical tests were consistent with lab results pointing to excellent sharpness. However, exposure testing seems to belie the stated f-number capabilities of the lens, since stopping down from widest aperture did not change results, according to Gietler.

At its widest aperture, the sharpness does not meet the 1800 threshold at either 8 mm (1572, f/4.5) or 12 mm (1356, f/5), but at 16 mm (f/5.6) it achieves over 2000 lines per picture height. However, stopping down improves the sharpness at all focal lengths, according to PC Magazine. At 8 mm, 1800 is reached at f/8, while at 12 mm it is still only at 1509 by f/8. The image quality is asymmetric with better performance on the right side. At 8 mm and f/4.5, it has 1 blur unit in the center and 1.5 in the corners. Although the images are slightly sharper at f/5.6, SLR Gear claims sharpness declines significantly at f/11 to almost 2 blur units with further stopping down increasing blur to 3.5 at f/22. At the longer focal lengths for this lens, stopping down to f/29 yields a 5 blur unit result.

== Chromatic aberration ==
The lens is the first that incorporated Sigma's FLD glass elements, designed to correct color aberrations like fluoride glass does. Chromatic aberrations are indeed superior to earlier Sigma wide-angle lenses. In fact, although they might be noticeable at 100% image magnification, they are not at the magnifications now common with prints relative to the number of megapixels that images are commonly captured at. According to Sigma's website, Super Multi-Layer Coating reduces flare and ghosting. As one zooms out with this lens chromatic aberration becomes significant at the corners.

== Action photography ==
The aperture stop-down focal lengths make the lens a laggard among wide-angle lenses. Thus, it is not strong at gathering light for stop action photography. However, DSLR cameras have improved at higher ISO settings. However, wide-angle photography (below 16mm) continues to need stronger lighting than is possible by built in flashes if trying to make up for low light situations.

== Close focus and macro ==
At 8 mm and 16 mm, respectively, the lens is able to focus on an area 12.25 inches (31.1 cm) and 7 inches (18 cm) in width. Although the official close focus distance is 24 centimetres (9.4 in), Scott Gietler reported that by using the spot-focus mode, rather than multiple focus points, he was able to achieve a 3 inches (7.6 cm) minimum working distance (glass to subject).

== Critical commentary ==
The lens is useful for deliberative shots by landscape photographers and other skilled artists. The challenge of the vast field of view may be overcome by some casual users. Car photographers benefit from the new perspective of this lens. The lens was a 2010 American Photo Editor's Choice.
