= Canon EF 24-105mm lens =

EF mount wide-to-telephoto zoom lens

The EF 24–105mm f/4L IS USM is an EF mount wide-to-telephoto zoom lens. It was introduced by Canon in 2005 to complement the well-regarded 17–40mm f/4L USM and 70–200mm f/4L USM.

The EF 24–105mm f/4L IS USM lens is often compared to the other L series zoom of comparable range, the 24–70mm f/2.8L USM, losing one full stop but gaining image stabilization (IS) in return, stabilizing camera shake up to three stops. It also has rubber gaskets for moisture and dust protection, although weather sealing is only effective if the photographer uses a weather-resistant camera body. Some early production models of the EF 24–105mm f/4L IS USM lens had a flare problem (reportedly the first 10,000 batch) and Canon offered to repair them for free.

This EF 24–105mm f/4L IS USM lens is available in kits packaged with the EOS 5D Mk II, 5D Mk III and EOS 6D.

The EF 24-105mm f/3.5-5.6 IS STM is a newer 'low cost' alternative to the EF 24–105mm f/4L IS USM. It has the same zoom range, but a non-constant aperture range which is typical of many non-professional zoom lenses. Both lenses have image stabilization (IS). The EF 24–105mm f/4L IS USM and IS II USM version use a ring type ultrasonic motor, whereas the new EF 24-105mm f/3.5-5.6 IS STM uses Canon's STM stepper motor, which is quieter during video usage. The new EF 24-105mm f/3.5-5.6 IS STM weighs slightly less (525 g / 18.52 oz versus 670 g / 23.6 oz) and costs roughly half the price of the EF 24–105mm f/4L IS USM.

An improved version of the EF 24–105mm f/4L IS USM, the EF 24–105mm f/4L IS II USM, was announced in August 2016. It has a better image stabilizer and less distortion. The EF 24–105mm f/4L IS II USM lens is available in kits packaged with the EOS 5D Mk IV.

On a 1.6x APS-C camera body, this lens' field of view is equivalent to that of a 38–168mm lens on a 35mm film camera; this is a very useful range, covering most normal to medium-telephoto needs.

== Features ==
Optical scheme of Canon EF 24–105L IS USM lens

- The lens includes sealing against dust and water, although it is not waterproof.
- It includes an 8-bladed curved diaphragm which remains nearly circular from f/4 to f/8.
- Like many Canon L-series lenses, it uses common 77mm filters.
- Characteristic of zoom lenses, it exhibits some barrel distortion at its shortest focal length.
- It contains a single Super-UD glass element (dark blue in diagram) and 3 aspherical lens elements (green in diagram).

== Specifications ==
Attribute	f/4L IS USM	f/3.5-5.6 IS STM	f/4L IS II USM
Image			
Key features
Full-frame compatible	Yes		
Image stabilizer	Yes (3 stops)	Yes (4 stops)	
Environmental Sealing	Yes	No	Yes
Ultrasonic Motor	Yes	No	Yes
Stepping Motor	No	Yes	No
L-series	Yes	No	Yes
Diffractive Optics	No		
Macro	No		
Zoom Lock Lever	No	Yes	
Technical data
Maximum Aperture	f/4.0	f/3.5-5.6	f/4.0
Minimum Aperture	f/22	f/22-32	f/22
Construction	13 groups / 18 elements	13 groups / 17 elements	12 groups / 17 elements
# of diaphragm blades	8	7	10
Closest focusing distance	0.45 m (1.5 ft)	0.4 m (1.3 ft)	0.45 m (1.5 ft)
Max. magnification	0.23x	0.3x	0.24x
Horizontal viewing angle	74° - 19° 20′		
Diagonal viewing angle	84° - 23° 20′		
Vertical viewing angle	53° - 13°		
Physical data
Weight	670 g (24 oz)	525 g (18.5 oz)	795 g (28.0 oz)
Maximum diameter	83.5 mm / 3.3"	83.4 mm / 3.3"	83.5 mm / 3.3"
Length	107 mm / 4.2"	104 mm / 4.1"	118 mm / 4.7"
Filter diameter	77 mm		
Accessories
Lens hood	EW-83H	EW-83M	
Case	LP1219		
Retail information
Release date	October 2005	September 2014	August 2016
Currently in production?	No	Yes	
MSRP (US$)	$1249.00	$599.99	$1099.99
