= Canon EF-S 17–55mm lens =

EF-S 17–55mm f/2.8 IS USM
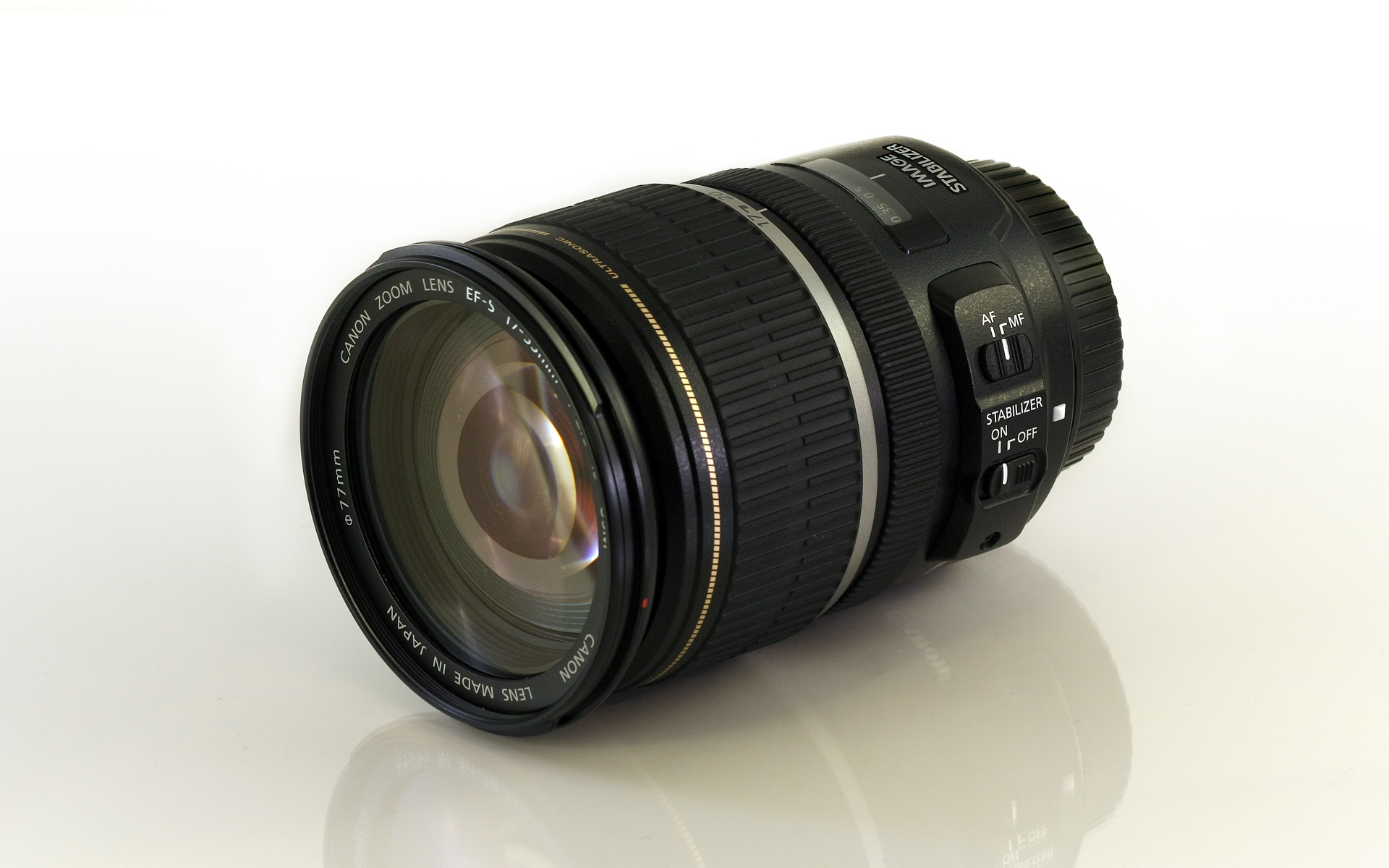
- Maker: Canon

Technical data
- Type: Zoom
- Focal length: 17–55mm
- Focal length (35mm equiv.): 27–88mm
- Crop factor: 1.6
- Aperture (max/min): f/2.8 / f/22
- Close focus distance: 0.35 m (1.15 ft)
- Max. magnification: 0.17 @ 55mm
- Diaphragm blades: 7
- Construction: 19 elements in 12 groups

Features
- Short back focus: Yes Yes
- Ultrasonic motor: Yes Yes
- Lens-based stabilization: Yes Yes
- Macro capable: No No
- Application: Fast standard zoom

Physical
- Max. length: 110.6 mm (4.4 in)
- Diameter: 83.5 mm (3.3 in)
- Weight: 645 g
- Filter diameter: 77 mm

Accessories
- Lens hood: EW-83J, optional
- Case: LP1219, optional

Angle of view
- Horizontal: 68°40'–23°20'
- Vertical: 48°–15°40'
- Diagonal: 78°30'–27°50'

History
- Introduction: 2006

Retail info
- MSRP: 1,179 USD

The Canon EF-S 17–55mm f/2.8 IS USM is a standard zoom lens for Canon digital single-lens reflex cameras with an EF-S lens mount. The field of view has a 35 mm equivalent focal length of 27–88mm.

== Reception ==
=== Praise ===
It is praised as "one of the best general/multi-purpose lenses available", and ideal for available light photography on a Canon APS-C camera.

The fast f/2.8 aperture, combined with 3-stop image stabilization, makes the 17–55 very useful in low light compared to an unstabilized f/3.5–5.6 Canon EF-S 18–55mm lens, which is a frequent kit lens, and thus the 17–55 is much more suited for hand holding and available-light photography. Newer versions of the 18–55 kit lens include 4-stop image stabilization, but retain the slower aperture, partly addressing this concern.

=== Criticism ===
This lens has been criticized by one review as prone to flare when the sun is in the frame.

The 17–55 suffers from vignetting at f/2.8 of 0.5–1 EV throughout the focal range, though current Canon bodies are able to correct this by storing the vignetting data within the camera memory.

Chromatic aberration is a relative weakness at the wide end (at the edges and corners), but is quite low for a zoom lens in this range. Barrel distortion is evident at the wide end.

Some users have reported dust gathering inside the lens.

=== Quality ===
The 17–55mm is not an L-series lens, but it has two UD (ultra-low dispersion) lens elements, which are largely reserved for L-series lenses, and some say that the 17–55 has comparable image quality to L-series lenses. Some regard the decision to not designate the lens as L-class as marketing-driven, but being EF-S it will not fit on a full-frame body—therefore, at least under current Canon marketing strategy, cannot be labeled L-series.

"The resolution figures are among the very best seen so far for an APS-C standard zoom lens."

The build quality is inferior to L-series lenses (plastic body, not magnesium alloy), though superior to the EF-S 17–85mm lens.

== Similar lenses ==
Unlike most other EF-S lenses, the 17–55mm does not have a direct equivalent in the range of traditional EF lenses. As a general purpose EF-S zoom lens, the alternatives to the 17–55mm are the EF-S 18–55mm f/3.5–5.6, which is a cheaper kit lens; the EF-S 17–85mm f/4–5.6 IS USM, which is midway between the 18–55mm and 17–55mm in some respects – depending on which version of the 18–55 one is comparing – and boasts a longer telephoto end; and the newer EF-S 15–85mm f/3.5–5.6 IS USM, which has similar build quality to the 17–55mm and the largest focal length range of the group.

The 17–55 is at times compared to the EF 17–40mm f/4L USM, which has similar image quality (despite the latter being L series and the 17–55 not being so designated), though the 17–55's faster aperture and IS make it more suited (by one stop) for hand-holding and available light photography. Also, it can be compared to the three Canon EF 24–70 mm L lenses. Two of the 24–70 lenses have the same f/2.8 maximum aperture as the 17–55, but no image stabilization; the newest 24–70 has a maximum f/4 aperture but adds stabilization. When mounted on their equivalent cameras (full-frame for the 24–70, and crop for the 17–55), the two lenses have similar focal lengths. The IS system of the 17–55 gives that lens an advantage over the 24–70 f/2.8 in lower light by reducing the amount of camera shake. The 17–55 and the 24–70 f/4 are both stabilized, but the 17–55 has a one-stop advantage over that version of the 24–70.

The EF 28–90mm, though having corresponding full-frame equivalent focal length, is an inexpensive kit lens and is not comparable to the 17–55mm, having a slower, variable maximum aperture, lower overall image quality, and no image stabilization.
