= Canon EF 17-35mm lens =

Canon SLR EF mount zoom lens

EF 17–35mm f/2.8L USM
- Maker: Canon

Technical data
- Type: Zoom
- Focus drive: Ultrasonic motor
- Focal length: 17–35 mm
- Crop factor: 1.0
- Aperture (max/min): f/2.8–f/22
- Close focus distance: 0.42 m
- Max. magnification: 0.11x
- Diaphragm blades: 7
- Construction: 15 elements in 10 groups

Features
- Short back focus: No No
- Lens-based stabilization: No No
- Macro capable: No No
- Unique features: L-Series
- Application: Ultra-Wide Zoom

Physical
- Max. length: 95.7 mm
- Diameter: 83.5 mm
- Weight: 545 g
- Filter diameter: 77 mm

History
- Introduction: April 1996

The Canon EF 17–35mm f/2.8L USM lens was a wide-angle zoom lens made by Canon Inc. It was replaced by the Canon EF 16–35mm lens.
