= Canon EF 24–70mm lens =

Canon DSLR EF mount lens

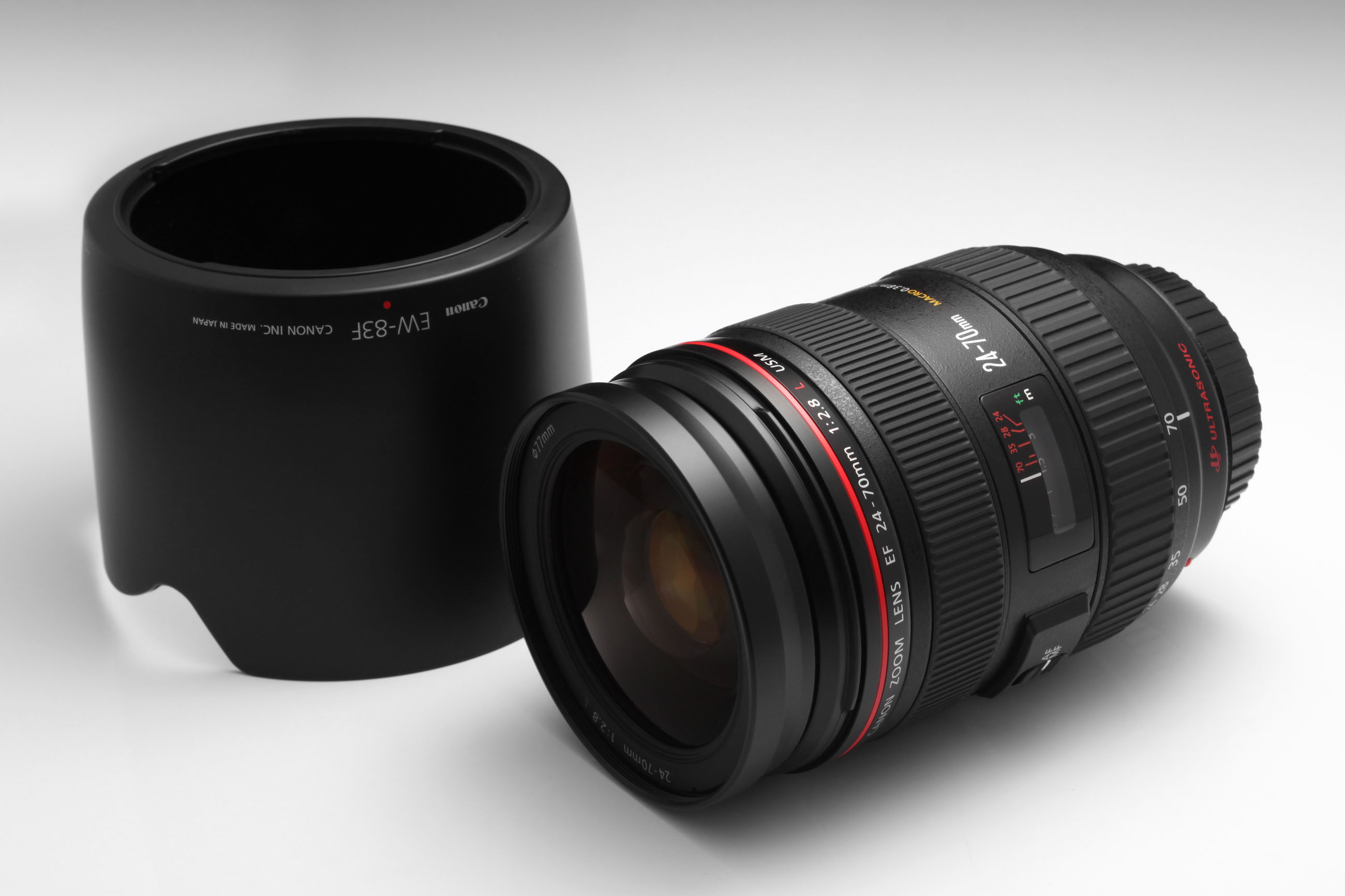
Canon EF 24–70mm f/2.8L lens with hood (EW-83F)

The Canon EF 24–70mm lens is a family of professional EF mount wide-to-normal zoom lenses manufactured and sold by Canon. The first of the family, the EF 24–70mm f/2.8L, was introduced in 2002 to replace the well-regarded 28–70mm f/2.8L. Two later versions were announced in 2012. The first of these, the EF 24–70mm f/2.8L II, was announced by Canon in February, but would not ship to customers until September of that year. This lens replaced the Mk I, and had an MSRP of US$2299 when introduced. The latest member of the family is the EF 24–70mm f/4L IS USM, which became available in January 2013. The f/4 version, which is the first of the family to include image stabilization, was initially reported to be the standard kit lens for the Canon EOS 6D, but did not appear in 6D kits in most markets until late 2014, and 5D Mark IV kit in 2016.

Like its predecessor, the f/2.8 Mk I lens was often considered to have excellent contrast, color rendition and decent sharpness wide open. However, some samples of this lens have also been reported to exhibit deficiencies and operational problems not present in the older 28–70mm lens, including poor sharpness and/or chromatic aberration. According to the head of a US lens rental firm, the f/2.8 Mk I lens "definitely has some reliability issues and a lot of copy-to-copy variation, at least some of which relate to its design."

Early reports on the f/2.8 Mk II indicated significant improvement in optical quality. The aforementioned rental firm head stated, All versions of the lens include sealing against dust and water, although they are not waterproof. The f/2.8 Mk I includes an 8-bladed curved diaphragm, while both the f/2.8 Mk II and f/4 include a 9-bladed curved diaphragm. The diaphragm of the f/2.8 Mk I remains nearly circular from f/2.8 to f/5.6, according to the Canon Press release from 2002. Characteristic of zoom lenses, it exhibits some barrel distortion at its shortest focal length.

== Reverse zoom ==
An unusual aspect of the f/2.8 Mk I lens (and the 28–70mm f/2.8L) is that its barrel extends as it zooms toward its shortest focal length. When used with the supplied lens hood, which attaches to a non-moving part of the lens, this extension results in a properly matched shade at every angle of view. Most zoom lens hoods are designed for only the widest angle of view, offering progressively inadequate shade at longer focal lengths.

This reverse zoom is illustrated with the following two pictures:

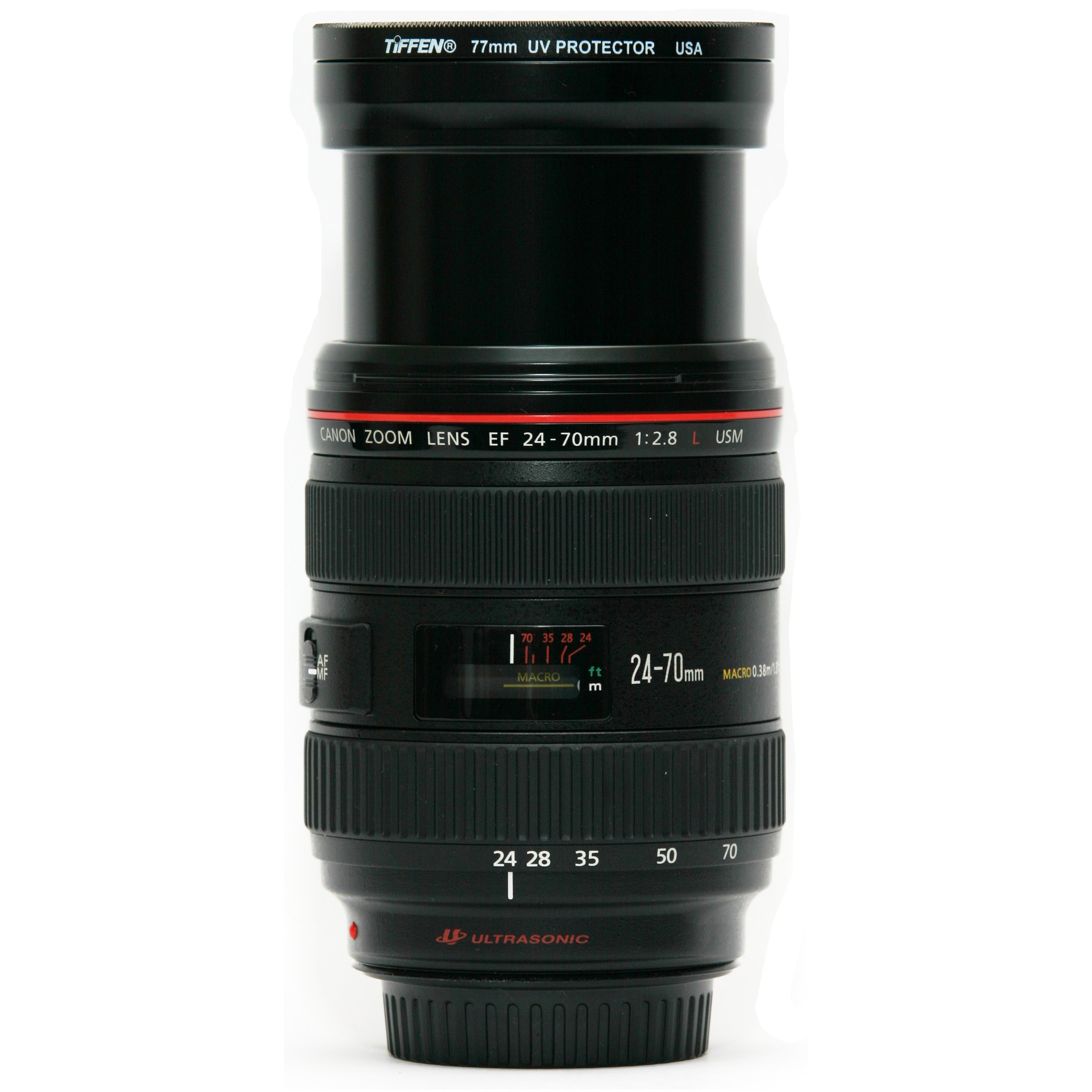
Lens at 24 mm with a UV filter

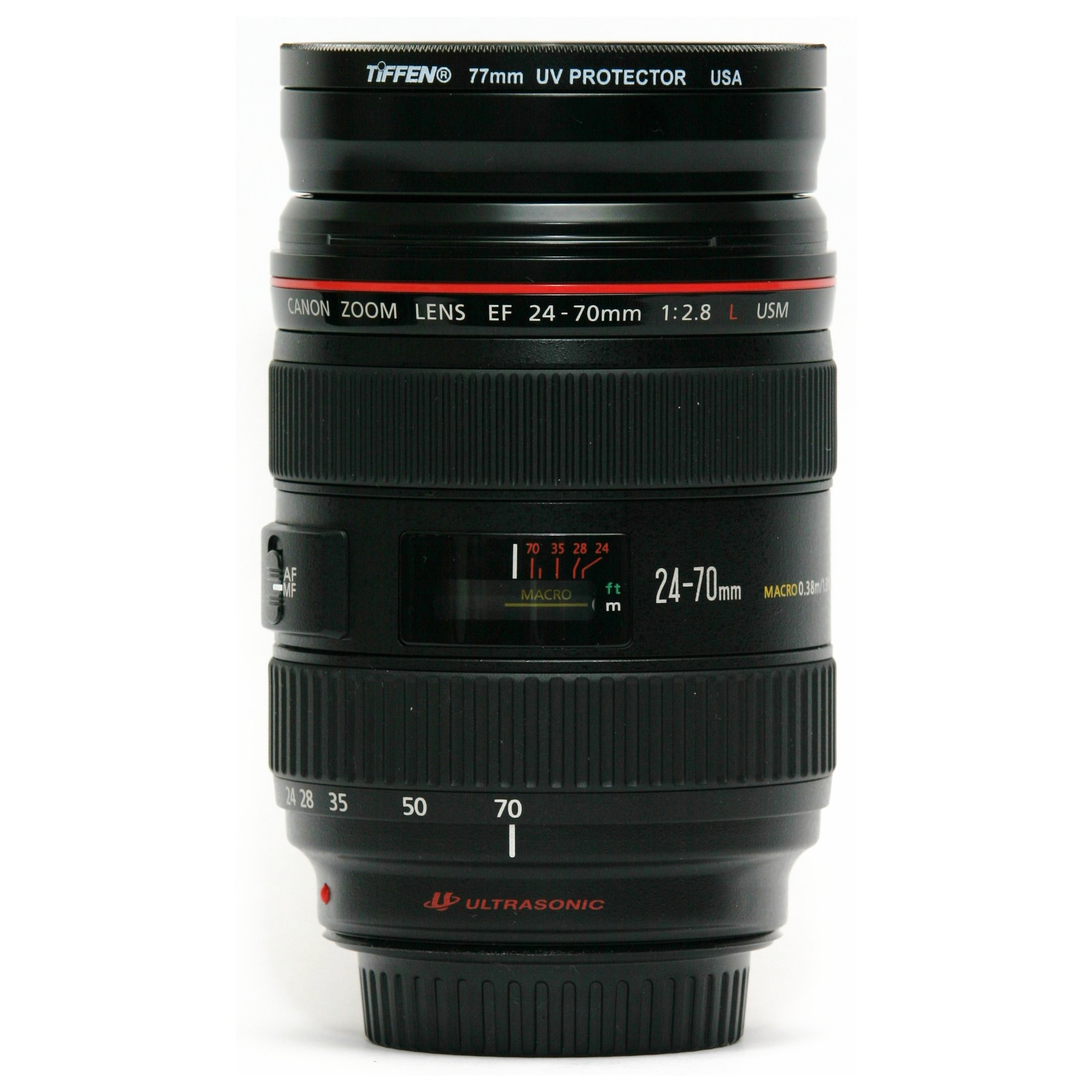
Lens at 70 mm with a UV filter

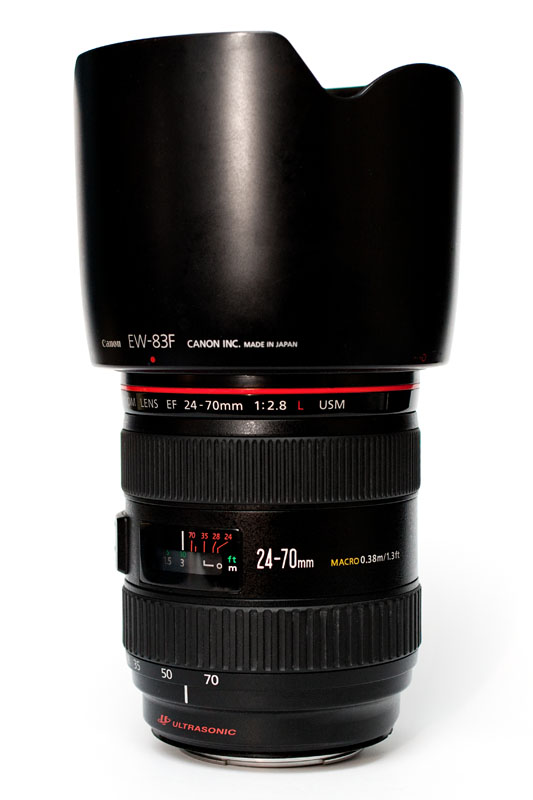
Lens with lens hood

At the telephoto end (70 mm), the end of the lens is the most retracted providing the most shade protection from the lens hood. At the widest end (24 mm), the end of the lens is the most protruding providing the least shade protection from the lens hood.

The f/2.8 Mk II lens, however, has a more conventional design, with the barrel extending as the focal length increases. The lens hood is much shorter than that of the Mk I version. The f/4 lens shares the same conventional design.

== Macro ==
The f/2.8 versions are not true 1x macro lenses (1:1); the f/2.8 Mk I has a maximum magnification of only 0.29x and the f/2.8 Mk II has 0.21x. The f/4 lens, while also not a true macro lens, is considerably closer to being in that category. The f/4 has a switch-activated "macro" mode; at 70 mm, the maximum magnification is approximately 0.7x and the closest focusing distance is 20 cm.

== Specifications ==
Attribute	f/2.8L USM	f/2.8L II USM	f/4L IS USM
Image			
Key features
Full-frame compatible	Yes		
Image stabilizer	No		Yes, Hybrid system (4 stops)
Environmental Sealing	Yes		
Ultrasonic Motor	Yes		
L-series	Yes		
Diffractive Optics	No		
Macro	No		Yes
Zoom Lock Lever	No	Yes	
Technical data
Maximum Aperture	f/2.8		f/4.0
Minimum Aperture	f/22		
Construction	13 groups / 16 elements	13 groups / 18 elements	12 groups / 15 elements
# of diaphragm blades	8	9	
Closest focusing distance	0.38 m / 1.25 ft		0.38 m / 1.25 ft (normal mode); 0.20 m / 0.66 ft (macro mode)
Max. magnification	0.29×	0.21×	0.70×
Horizontal viewing angle	74°–29°		
Diagonal viewing angle	84°–34°		
Vertical viewing angle	53°–19°30'		
Physical data
Weight	950 g (34 oz)	805 g (28.4 oz)	600 g (21 oz)
Maximum diameter	83.2 mm (3.3")	88.5 mm (3.5")	83.4 mm (3.3")
Length	123.5 mm (4.9")	113 mm (4.4")	93 mm (3.7")
Filter diameter	77mm	82mm	77mm
Accessories
Lens hood	EW-83F	EW-88C	EW-83L
Retail information
Release date	November 2002	September 2012	December 2012
Currently in production?	No	Yes	No
MSRP (US$)	$1349.00	$2099.00	$999.00

== See also ==
- Canon EF 24–105mm lens, available in two versions—one an L class lens, and the other a consumer-level lens—with a similar but slightly longer focal length. The L version has a maximum aperture of f/4 and image stabilization, similar to the 24-70mm f/4L IS USM, but lacks that lens' macro feature. The consumer version is also image-stabilized, but replaces the USM motor drive with STM, has a variable maximum aperture, and also lacks a macro feature.
- Canon EF 70–200mm lens has both image-stabilized and non-IS versions with maximum apertures of f/2.8 and f/4.0, and continues the 24–70mm's maximum focal length through 200mm
