= Canon EF 11–24mm lens =

Canon SLR EF-mount zoom lens

The EF 11–24 mm f/4L USM lens is a professional wide-angle lens made by Canon Inc. It was announced on February 5, 2015, and at that time was the widest rectilinear lens ever made for the 35 mm format in either its film or digital versions.

The lens has an EF mount to work with the EOS line of cameras. Other than the front element, it is sealed against dust and water, and features a diaphragm which remains nearly circular. It produces minimally distorted images.

== Specifications ==
Attribute	f/4L USM
Image	
Key features
Full-frame compatible	Yes
Image stabilizer	No
Environmental Sealing	Yes
Ultrasonic Motor	Yes
L-series	Yes
Diffractive Optics	No
Technical data
Aperture (max–min)	f/4–f/22
Construction	11 groups / 16 elements
# of diaphragm blades	9
Closest focusing distance	0.28 m / 11" (at 24 mm)
Max. magnification	0.16× (at 24 mm)
Horizontal viewing angle	117° 10′–74°
Vertical viewing angle	95° 10′–53°
Diagonal viewing angle	126° 05′–84° 00′
Physical data
Weight	1180 g / 41.6 oz
Maximum diameter	108 mm / 4.3"
Length	243 mm / 5.2"
Filter diameter	rear
Accessories
Lens hood	n/a
Retail information
Release date	February 2015
Currently in production?	Yes
MSRP US$	$2,999.00

== Gallery ==
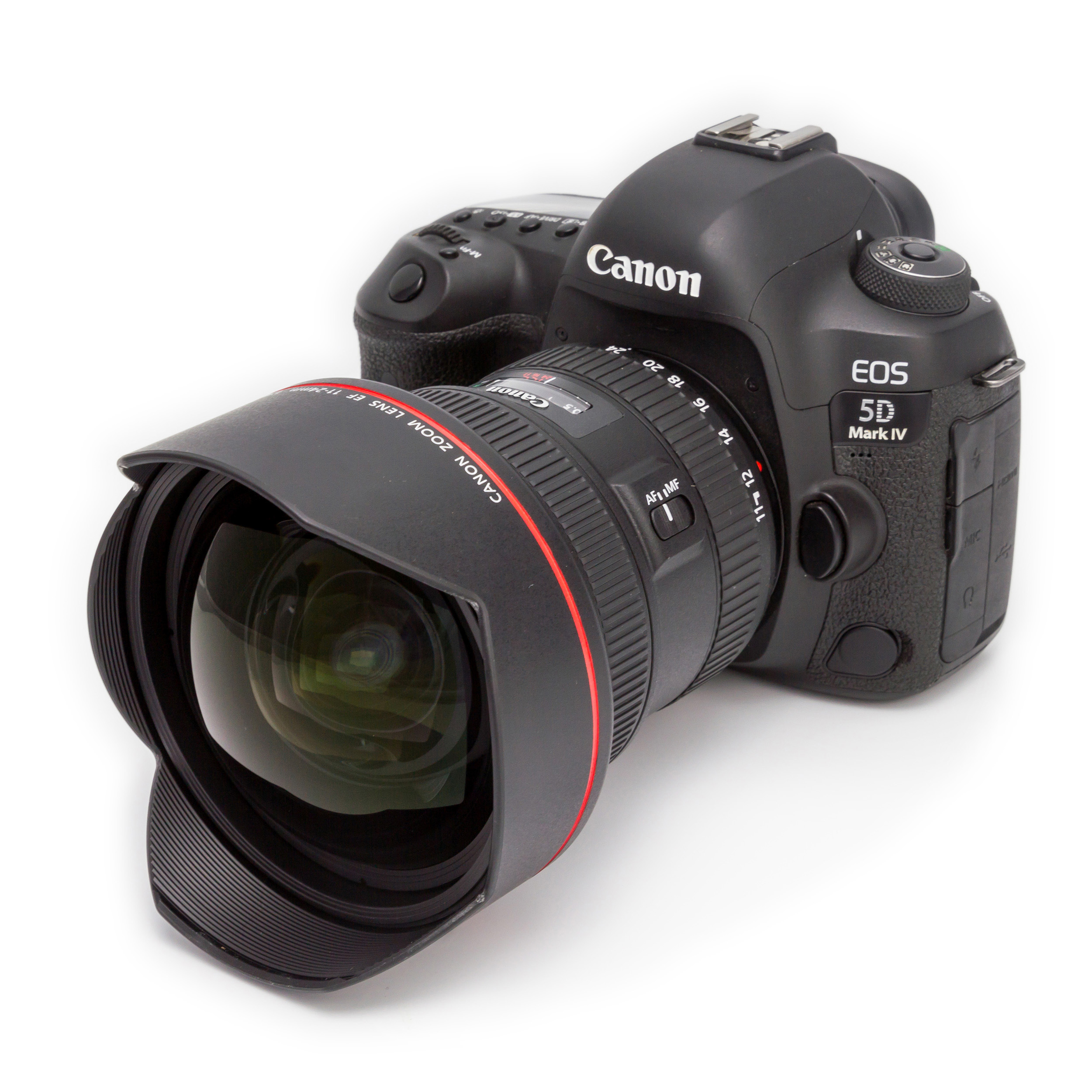
Canon EF 11-24mm F4L USM on a body EOS 5D Mark IV

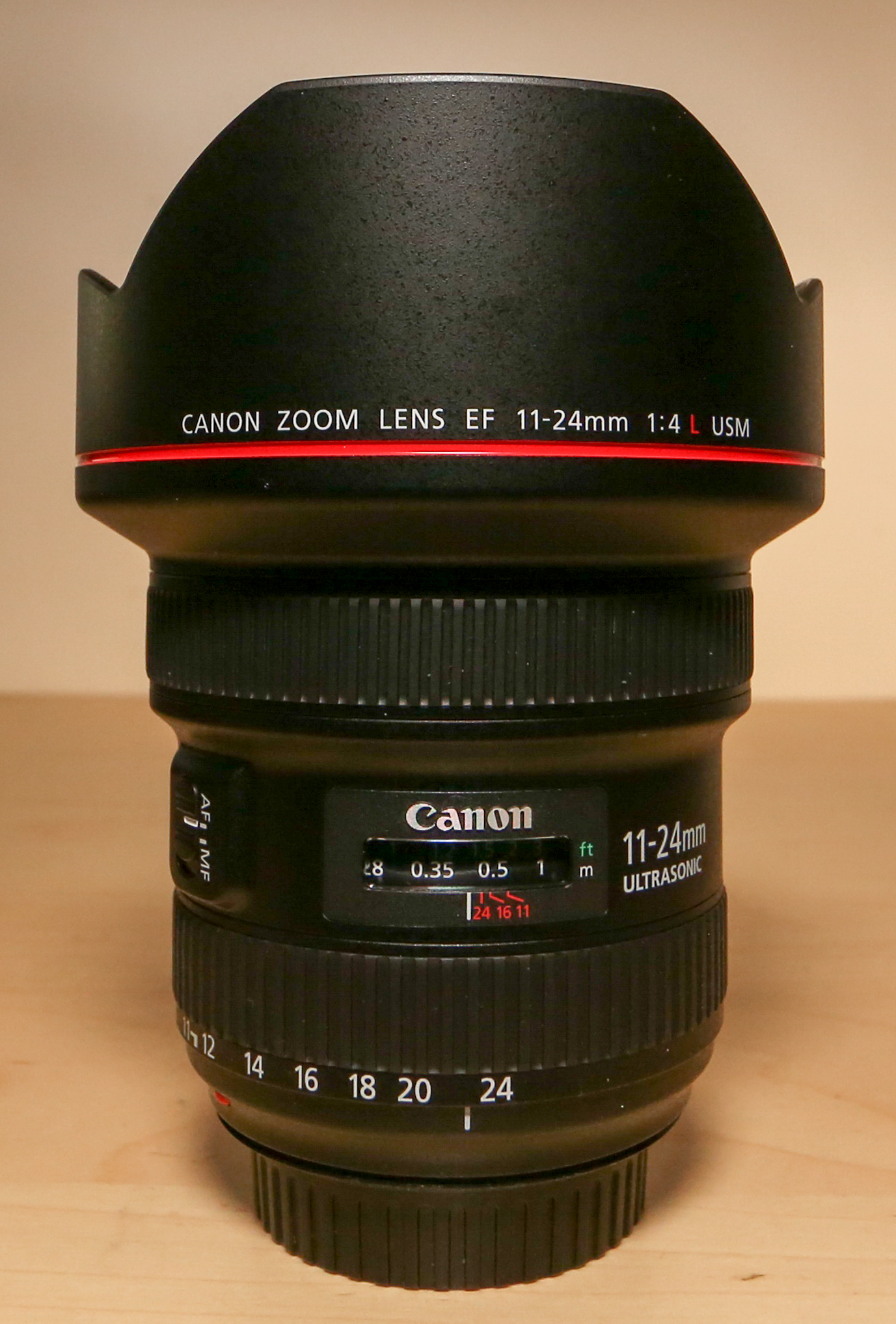
Canon EF 11-24mm F4L USM

== Similar lenses ==
- Nikon AF-S 14–24 mm f/2.8G IF-ED Lens. The Canon 11–24 mm has a wider field of view than the Nikon 14–24 mm, however, they are similar in size, weight, and intended usage.
- Sigma 12–24 mm f/4 DG HSM ART
