= Canon EF 17-40mm lens =

Canon DSLR EF mount lens

EF 17–40mm f/4L USM
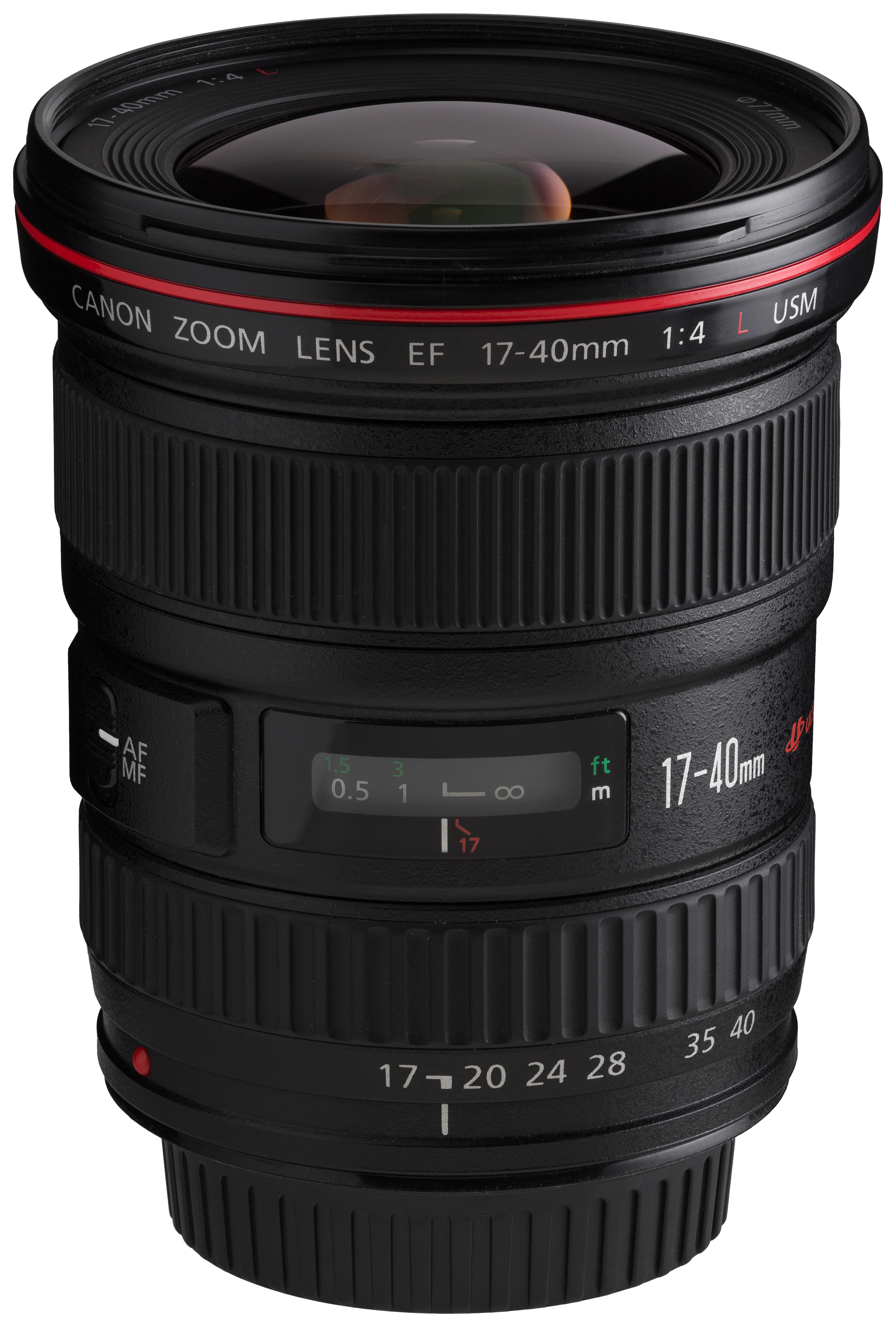
- Maker: Canon

Technical data
- Type: Zoom
- Focus drive: Ultrasonic motor
- Focal length: 17–40mm
- Crop factor: 1.0
- Aperture (max/min): f/4–f/22
- Close focus distance: 280mm / 11in
- Max. magnification: 0.24 (at 40mm)
- Diaphragm blades: 7
- Construction: 12 elements in 9 groups

Features
- Short back focus: No No
- Lens-based stabilization: No No
- Macro capable: No No
- Application: Ultra-Wide Zoom

Physical
- Max. length: 96.8mm / 3.8in
- Diameter: 83.5mm / 3.3in
- Weight: 475g / 1.1lbs
- Filter diameter: 77mm

Accessories
- Lens hood: EW-83E, EW-83H, EW-83J
- Case: LP1319

Angle of view
- Horizontal: 93°–49°20'
- Vertical: 70°30'–34°
- Diagonal: 104°–57°30'

History
- Introduction: 2003

Retail info
- MSRP: $800 USD

The EF 17–40mm f/4L USM lens is a wide-angle lens made by Canon Inc. The lens has an EF mount to work with the EOS line of cameras. Other than the front element, it is sealed against dust and water, and features a diaphragm which remains nearly circular from f/4 to f/8. It is one of the few Canon photo lenses that are parfocal.

== Audience ==
The 17–40mm is the least expensive of Canon's current wide-angle zooms for full-frame bodies, (Note: Canon offers three less expensive wide-angle zooms, but none of these three will mount on full-frame bodies. Two are EF-S lenses for Canon's APS-C DSLRs, and the other is an EF-M lens for the company's EOS M series of mirrorless cameras.) with the EF 16–35mm f/4L IS USM and EF 11–24mm f/4L USM being more expensive, and the EF 16–35mm f/2.8L USM being both faster and more expensive. Weighing 475 g and measuring 83.5 mm x 96.8 mm, it is a popular choice with many photographers because of its light and compact size. A member of the L-series, the 17–40mm is a good substitute for the 16–35mm f/2.8 lens, which is heavier and costs approximately twice as much. Canon now sells an image-stabilized 16–35mm f/4 lens for about $300 more than the 17–40.

This lens is also a popular step up from the stock kit lens on many of Canon's EOS Digital family of cameras, the EF-S 18–55mm f/3.5–5.6, for those still wanting a wide angle lens. On a cropped sensor, it has 35 mm equivalent focal length of 27–64mm. In this role, it is compared with the EF-S 17–55mm lens, with which it can unofficially share lens hoods.

== Companion lenses ==
This lens is often paired with an L series telephoto lens, such as the EF 28–300mm f/3.5–5.6 L USM or any of the EF 70–200mm family (f/4L USM, f/4L IS USM, f/2.8L USM, f/2.8L IS USM, f/2.8L IS II USM).

== Images ==
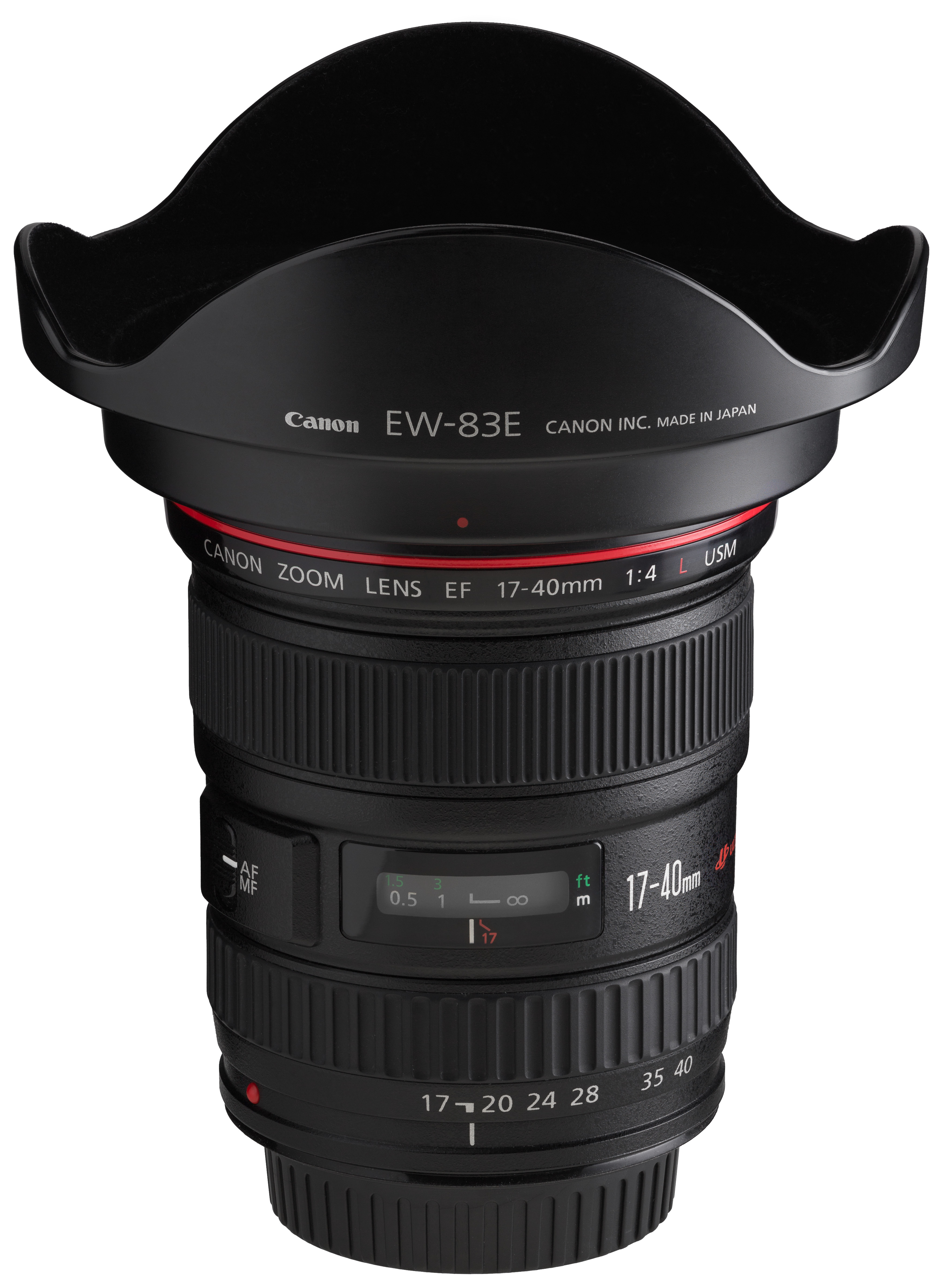
With the provided lens hood.

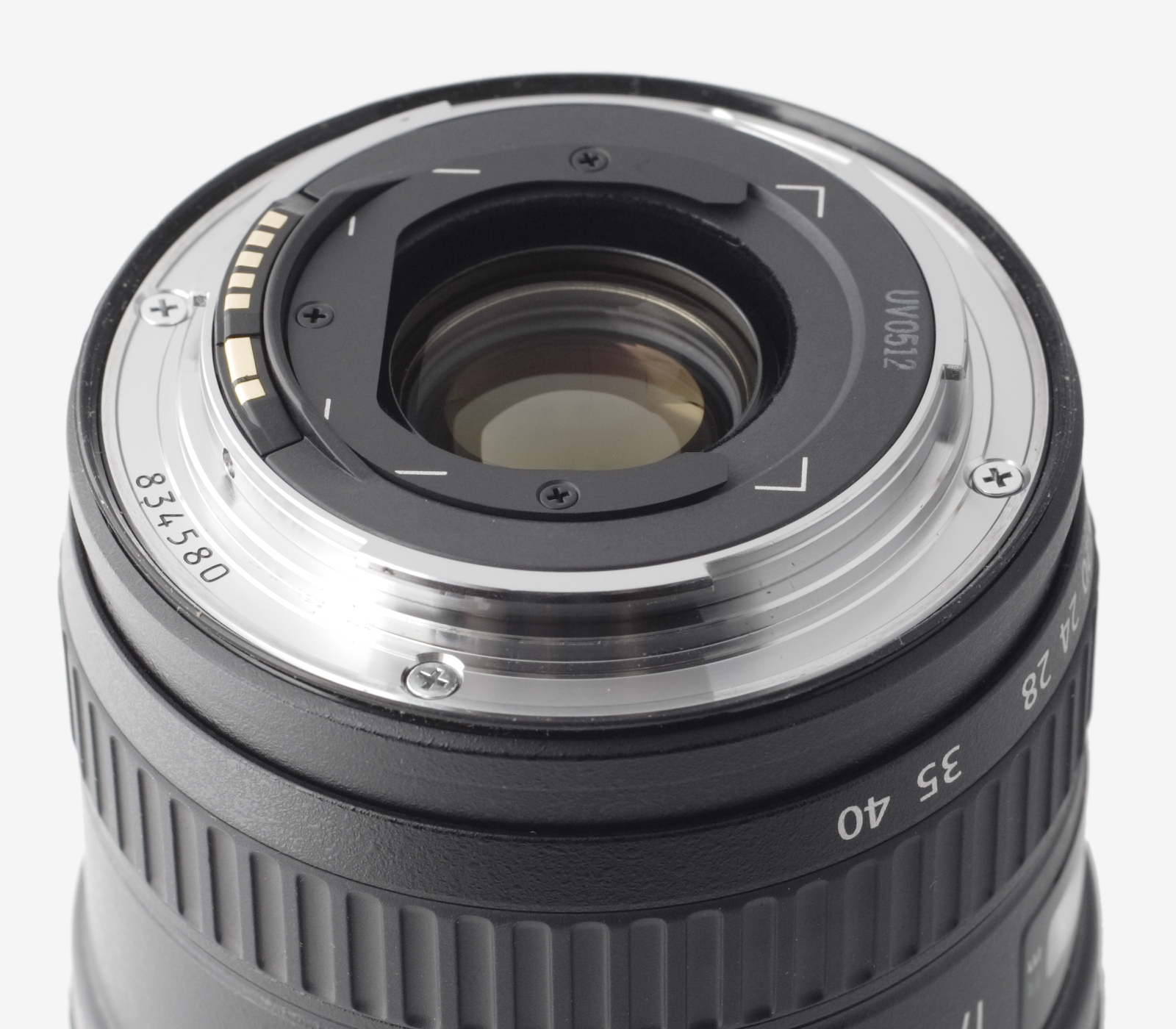
Weather-sealed lens mount with rear gelatin holder.

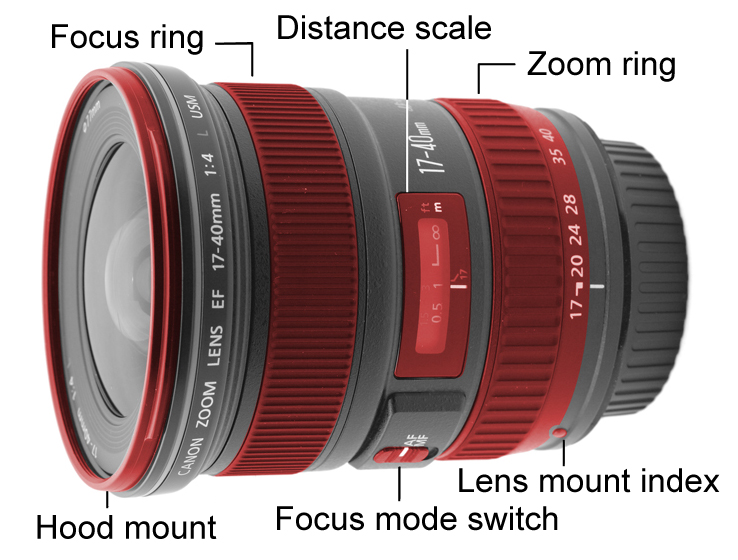
Diagram of the lens, highlighting its different controls and features.
