= Canon EF-S 10–18mm lens =

Canon DSLR EF-S-mount zoom lens

EF-S 10–18mm f/4.5–5.6 IS STM
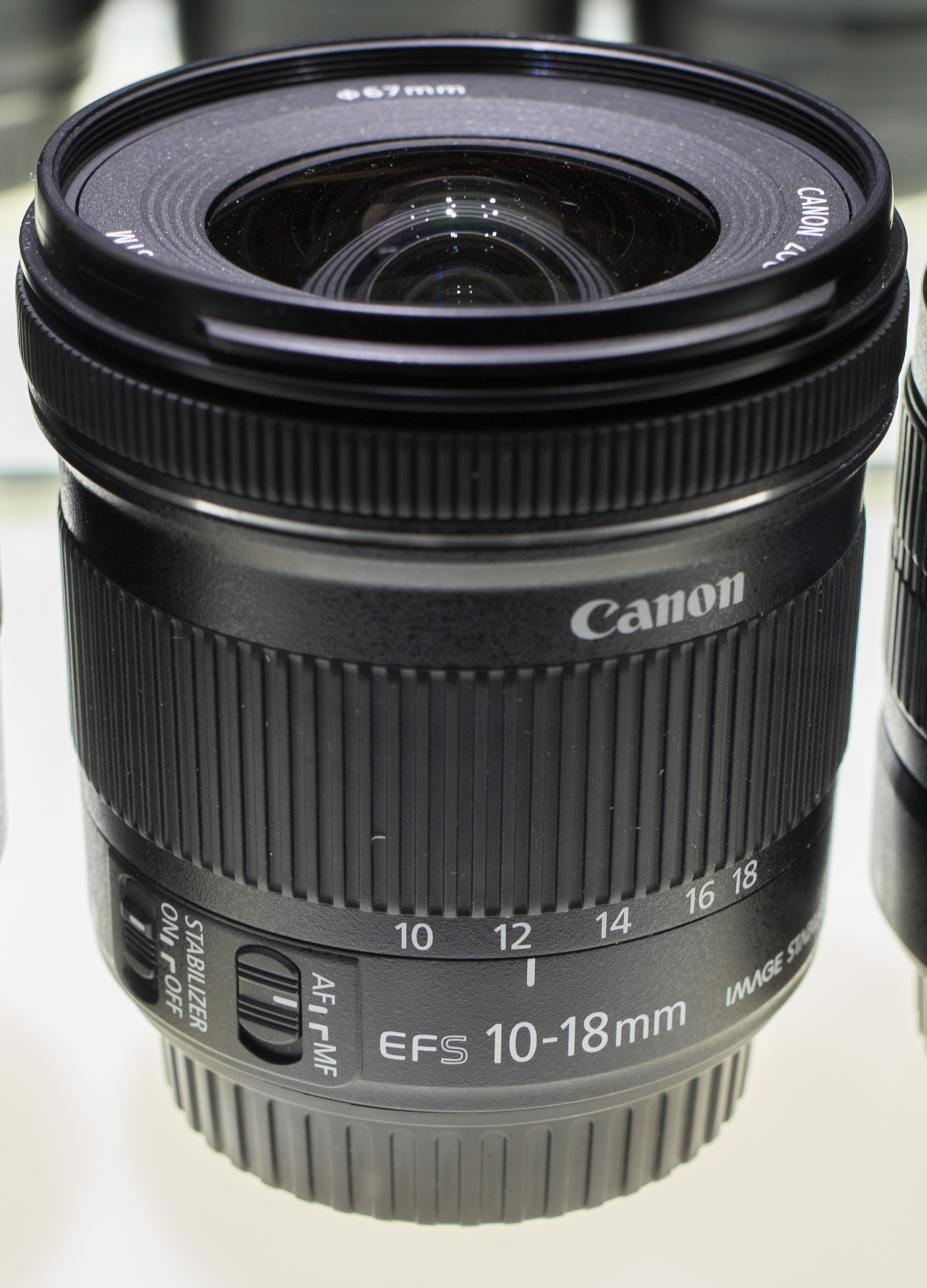
- Maker: Canon

Technical data
- Type: Zoom
- Focus drive: Stepping motor
- Focal length: 10-18 mm
- Focal length (35mm equiv.): 16-29 mm
- Crop factor: 1.6
- Aperture (max/min): f/4.5-5.6 / f/22-29
- Close focus distance: 0.22 m (0.72 ft)
- Max. magnification: 0.15 (at 18 mm)
- Diaphragm blades: 7
- Construction: 14 elements in 11 groups

Features
- Short back focus: Yes Yes
- Ultrasonic motor: No No
- Lens-based stabilization: Yes Yes
- Macro capable: No No
- Application: Ultra-Wide Zoom

Physical
- Max. length: 72 mm (2.8 in)
- Diameter: 74.6 mm (2.9 in)
- Weight: 240 g (8.5 oz)
- Filter diameter: 67 mm

Accessories
- Lens hood: EW-73C, optional
- Case: LP1116, optional

Angle of view
- Horizontal: 97°10′ - 64°30′
- Vertical: 74°10′ - 45°30′
- Diagonal: 107°30' - 74°20'

History
- Introduction: 2014

Retail info
- MSRP: 300 USD

The Canon EF-S 10–18mm f/4.5–5.6 IS STM lens is a wide to ultra-wide angle zoom lens for Canon digital single-lens reflex cameras that support the Canon EF-S lens mount. It was announced on May 13, 2014. though it began shipping to retailers by the end of May. It was Canon's 2nd ultra-wide lens with image stabilization to ship to retailers, the first being the EF-M 11–22mm STM. Canon announced a 16–35mm lens with IS on the same day as the 10–18.
