= Canon EF 28-135mm lens =

Canon DSLR EF mount lens

Canon EF 28–135 f/3.5–5.6 IS USM
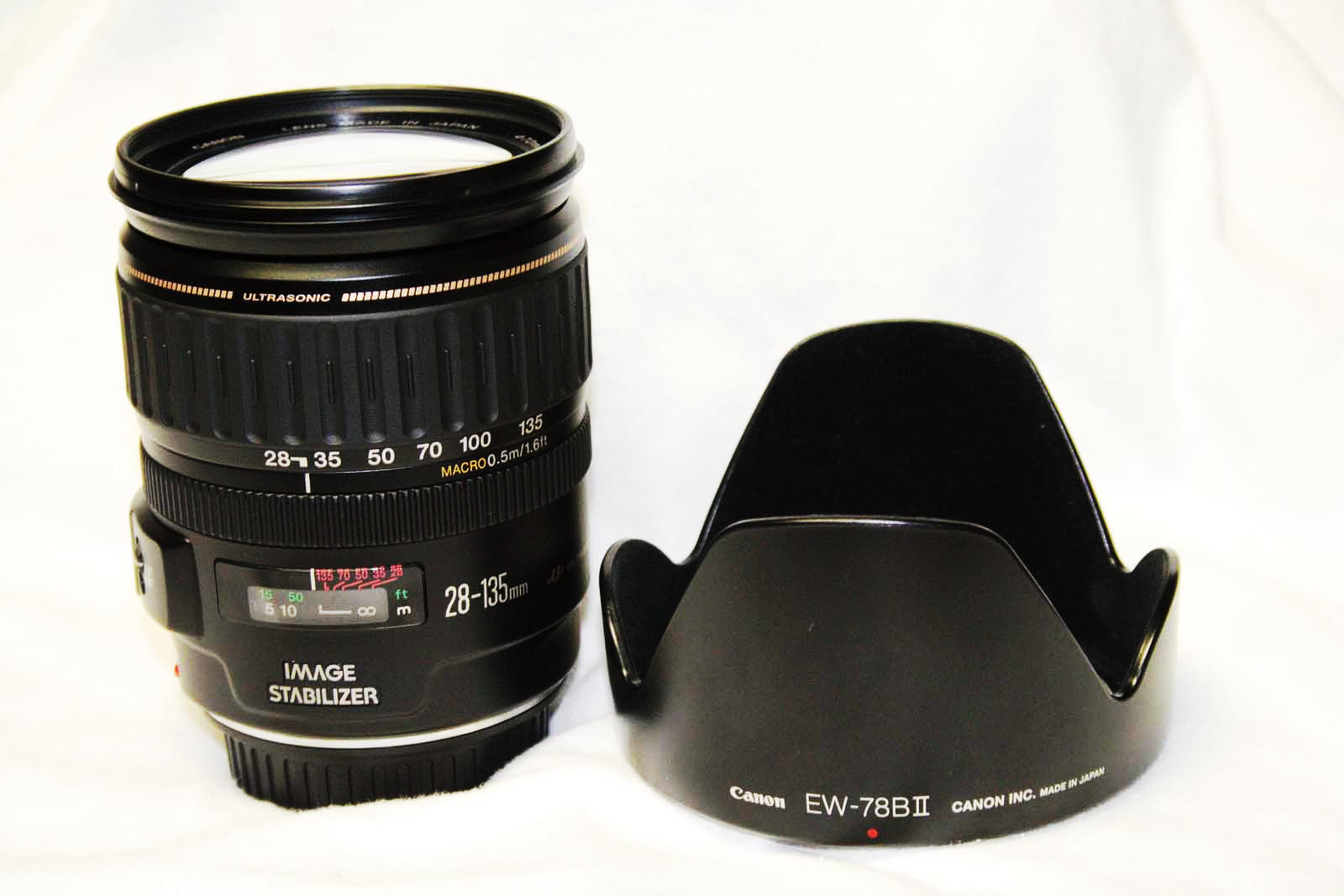
- Maker: Canon

Technical data
- Type: Zoom
- Focus drive: Ultrasonic motor
- Focal length: 28–135 mm
- Crop factor: 1.0
- Aperture (max/min): f/3.5–5.6–f/22–36
- Close focus distance: 0.5 m
- Max. magnification: 1:5.3
- Diaphragm blades: 6
- Construction: 16 elements in 12 groups

Features
- Short back focus: No No
- Lens-based stabilization: Yes Yes
- Application: Standard telezoom

Physical
- Max. length: 97 mm
- Diameter: 78 mm
- Weight: 540g
- Filter diameter: 72 mm

Accessories
- Lens hood: EW-78BII

Angle of view
- Diagonal: 75°–18°

History
- Introduction: February 1998

Retail info
- MSRP: $690 / 78,000 Yen USD

The Canon EF 28–135 f/3.5–5.6 IS USM is a "standard" zoom lens that was introduced in February, 1998. The lens has a 4.82x zoom range and is based on the EF Lens Mount and works with all film and digital EOS cameras that support this mount.

The lens features 2nd-generation image stabilization (IS) technology, ring-type USM with full-time manual focusing and a non-rotating front element, however the barrel does extend with zooming. The lens uses a six-blade aperture, and contains a single aspherical (molded, not ground) lens. Closest focusing distance is approximately 50 cm (19.2 inches).

The lens is generally considered a mid-range performer, with a good value to performance ratio that makes it popular as either a starter lens or an upgrade from lower quality lenses often purchased with a camera body. The range of zoom plus the Image Stabilization (IS) feature makes it an attractive walk-around, outdoor lens for general use. As a relatively slow lens, the usability in low light or indoor/no-flash situations is marginal, however this is where the IS regains some of that margin for some situations.

Although labeled as "Macro" on the lens and in some literature, this is not a true macro lens and cannot reproduce the subject image at 1:1 ratio on the film or image sensor, as with the Canon EF 100mm lens for full-frame bodies or the Canon EF-S 60mm f/2.8 Macro USM lens for EF-S bodies with a 1.6 crop factor. There is a Canon EF 50mm lens that produces a 1:2 maximum image ratio and is advertised as a "compact macro," which is also not a true 1:1 macro but may produce adequate results in some applications. Comparatively, the EF 28-135mm lens has a maximum reproduction ratio of 1:5.3.

This lens uses the Canon EW-78BII tulip-style lens hood.
