= Forced perspective =

Optical illusion

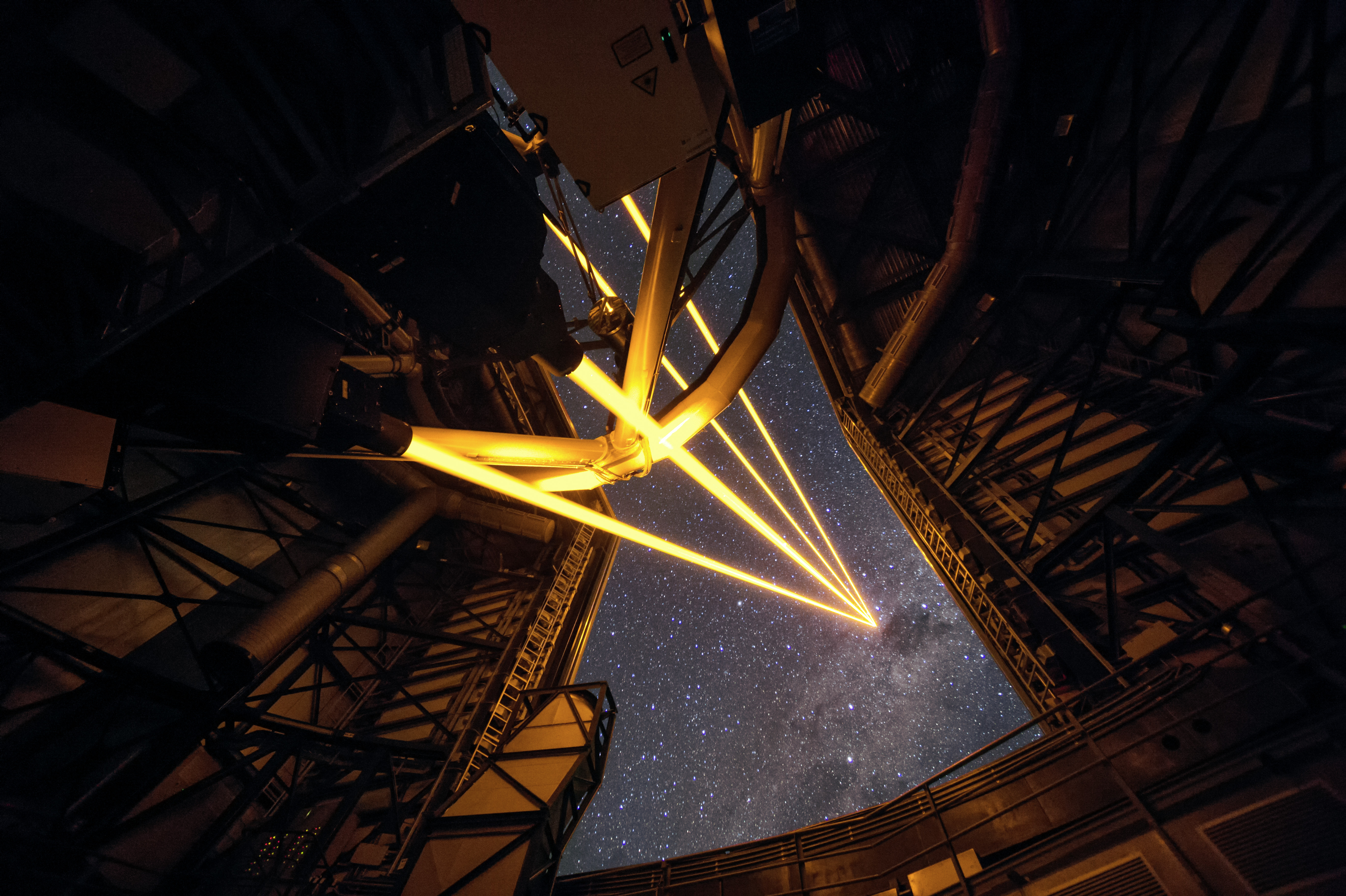
This image makes the Paranal Observatory's laser guide stars' "meeting point" feel closer than it really is. In reality, the beams extend to an infinite distance.

Forced perspective is a technique that employs optical illusion to make an object appear farther away, closer, larger or smaller than it actually is. It manipulates human visual perception through the use of scaled objects and the correlation between them and the vantage point of the spectator or camera. It has uses in photography, filmmaking and architecture.

== In filmmaking ==
Forced perspective had been a feature of German silent films, and Citizen Kane revived the practice. Movies, especially B-movies in the 1950s and 1960s, were produced on limited budgets and often featured forced perspective shots.

Forced perspective can be made more believable when environmental conditions obscure the difference in perspective. For example, the final scene of the famous movie Casablanca takes place at an airport in the middle of a storm, although the entire scene was shot in a studio. This was accomplished by using a painted backdrop of an aircraft, which was "serviced" by dwarfs standing next to the backdrop. A downpour (created in the studio) draws much of the viewer's attention away from the backdrop and extras, making the simulated perspective less noticeable.

=== Role of light ===
Early instances of forced perspective used in low-budget motion pictures showed objects that were clearly different from their surroundings, often blurred or at a different light level. The principal cause of this was geometric. Light from a point source travels in a spherical wave, decreasing in intensity (or illuminance) as the inverse square of the distance travelled. This means that a light source must be four times as bright to produce the same illuminance at an object twice as far away. Thus to create the illusion of a distant object being at the same distance as a near object and scaled accordingly, much more light is required. When shooting with forced perspective, it's important to have the aperture stopped down sufficiently to achieve proper depth of field (DOF), so that the foreground object and background are both sharp. Since miniature models would need to be subjected to far greater lighting than the main focus of the camera, the area of action, it is important to ensure that these can withstand the significant heat generated by the incandescent light sources typically used in film and TV production.

=== In motion ===
Peter Jackson's film adaptations of The Lord of the Rings make extended use of forced perspective. Characters apparently standing next to each other would be displaced by several feet in depth from the camera. This, in a still shot, makes some characters (Dwarves and Hobbits) appear much smaller than others. If the camera's point of view were moved, then parallax would reveal the true relative positions of the characters in space. Even if the camera is just rotated, its point of view may move accidentally if the camera is not rotated about the correct point. This point of view is called the 'zero-parallax-point' (or front nodal point), and is approximated in practice as the centre of the entrance pupil.

An extensively used technique in The Lord of the Rings: The Fellowship of the Ring was an enhancement of this principle, which could be used in moving shots. Portions of sets were mounted on movable platforms which would move precisely according to the movement of the camera, so that the optical illusion would be preserved at all times for the duration of the shot. The same techniques were used in the Harry Potter movies to make the character Rubeus Hagrid look like a giant. Props around Harry and his friends are of normal size, while seemingly identical props placed around Hagrid are in fact smaller.

=== Comic effects ===
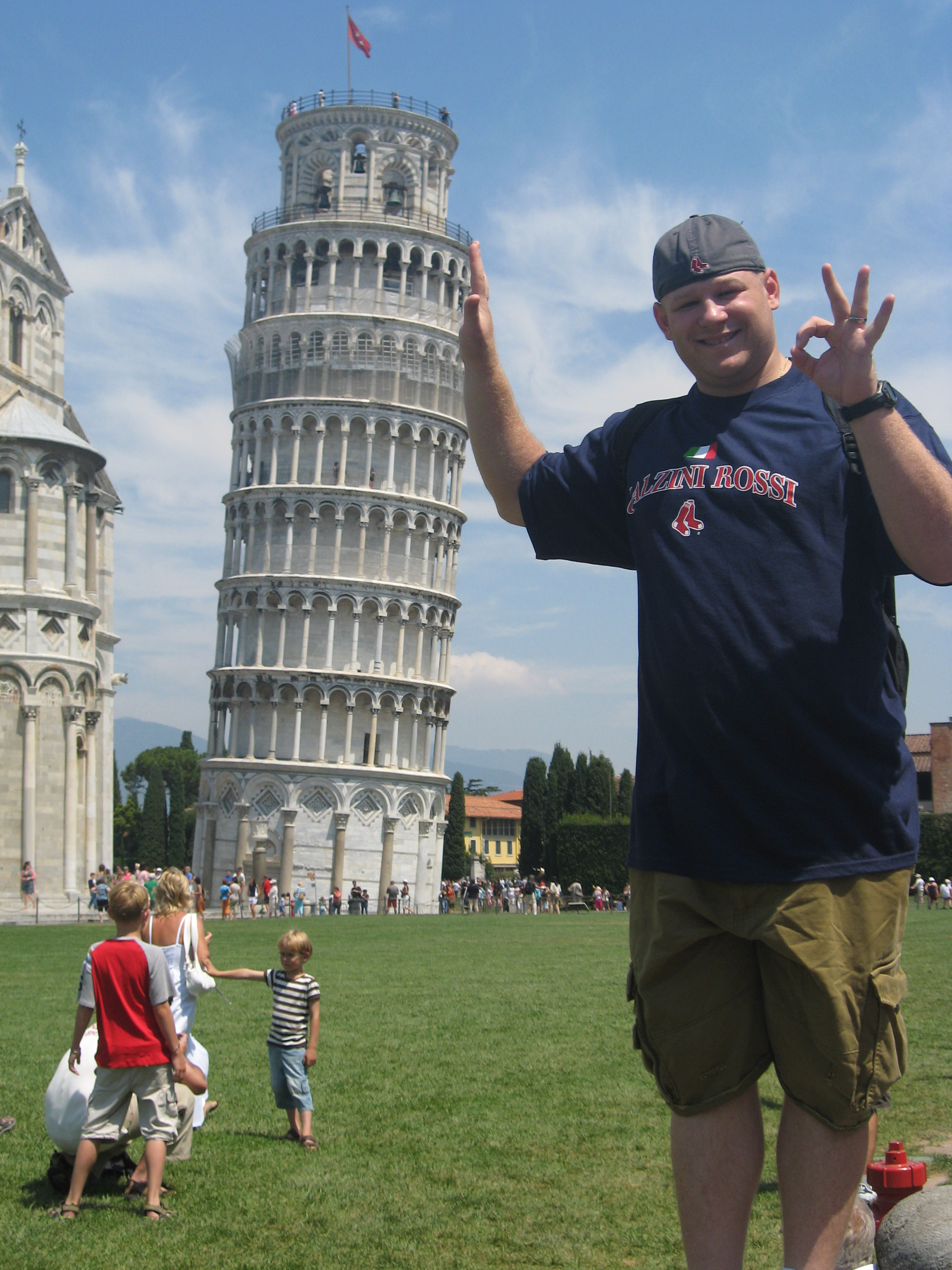
Use of forced perspective with tourist attractions like the Leaning Tower of Pisa is popular in tourist photography.

As with many film genres and effects, forced perspective can be used to visual-comedy effect. Typically, when an object or character is portrayed in a scene, its size is defined by its surroundings. A character then interacts with the object or character, in the process showing that the viewer has been fooled and there is forced perspective in use.

The 1930 Laurel and Hardy movie Brats used forced perspective to depict Stan and Ollie simultaneously as adults and as their own sons. An example used for comic effect can be found in the slapstick comedy Top Secret! in a scene which appears to begin as a close-up of a ringing phone with the characters in the distance. However, when the character walks up to the phone (towards the camera) and picks it up, it becomes apparent that the phone is extremely oversized instead of being close to the camera. Another scene in the same movie begins with a close-up of a wristwatch. The next cut shows that the character actually has a gargantuan wristwatch.

The same technique is also used in the Dennis Waterman sketch in the British BBC sketch show Little Britain. In the television version, larger than life props are used to make the caricatured Waterman look just three feet tall or less. In History of the World, Part I, while escaping the French peasants, Mel Brooks' character, Jacques, who is doubling for King Louis, runs down a hall of the palace, which turns into a ramp, showing the smaller forced perspective door at the end. As he backs down into the normal part of the room, he mutters, "Who designed this place?"

One of the recurring The Kids in the Hall sketches featured Mr. Tyzik, "The Headcrusher", who used forced perspective (from his own point of view) to "crush" other people's heads between his fingers. This is also done by the character Sheldon Cooper in the TV show The Big Bang Theory to his friends when they displease him. In the making of Season 5 of Red vs. Blue, the creators used forced perspective to make the character of Tucker's baby, Junior, look small. In the game, the alien character used as Junior is the same height as other characters. The short-lived 2013 Internet meme "baby mugging" used forced perspective to make babies look like they were inside items like mugs and teacups.

== In architecture ==
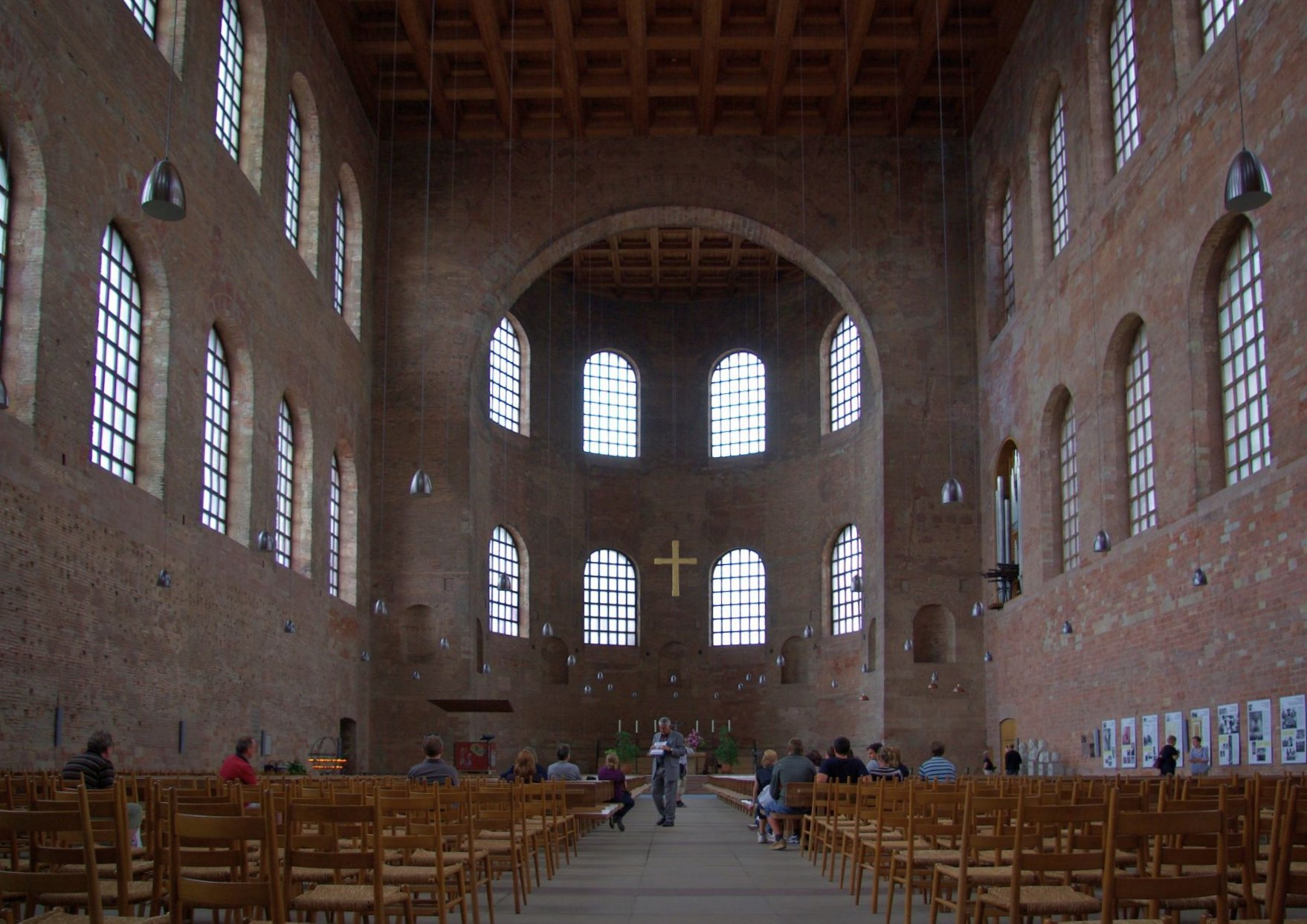
Forced perspective in the Roman Emperor Constantine's Aula Palatina, Trier: The windows and the coffer in the apse are smaller, and the apse has a raised floor.

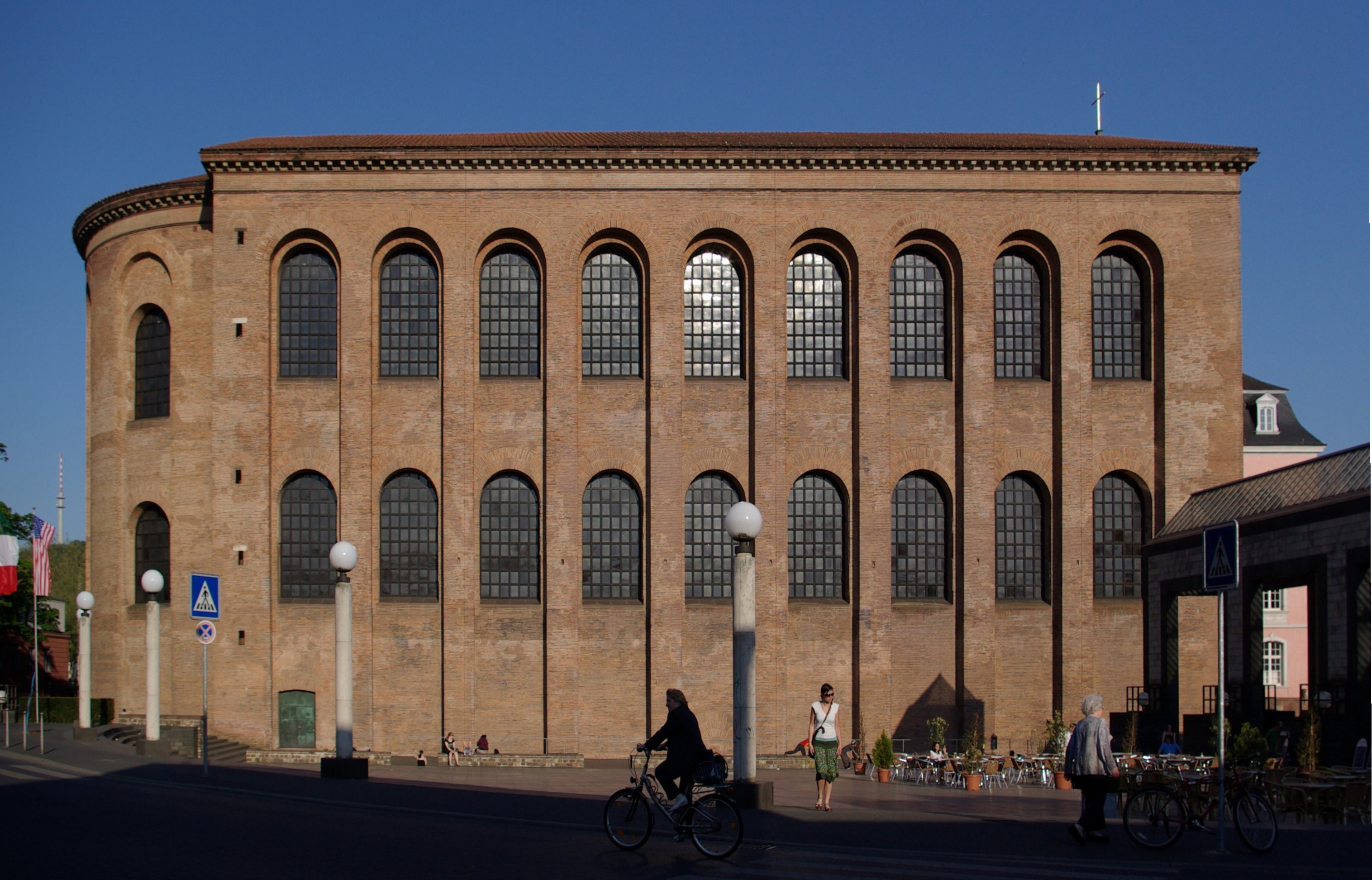
From the outside, the true size of the apsis windows is apparent.

In architecture, a structure can be made to seem larger, taller, farther away or otherwise by adjusting the scale of objects in relation to the spectator, increasing or decreasing perceived depth. When forced perspective is supposed to make an object appear farther away, the following method can be used: by constantly decreasing the scale of objects from expectancy and convention toward the farthest point from the spectator, an illusion is created that the scale of said objects is decreasing due to their distant location. In contrast, the opposite technique was sometimes used in classical garden designs and other follies to shorten the perceived distances of points of interest along a path.

The Statue of Liberty is built with a slight forced perspective so that it appears more correctly proportioned when viewed from its base. When the statue was designed in the late 19th century (before easy air flight), there were few other angles from which to view the statue. This caused a difficulty for special effects technicians working on the movie Ghostbusters II, who had to reduce the amount of forced perspective used when replicating the statue for the movie so that their model (which was photographed head-on) would not look top-heavy. This effect can also be seen in Michelangelo's statue of David.

== Through depth perception ==
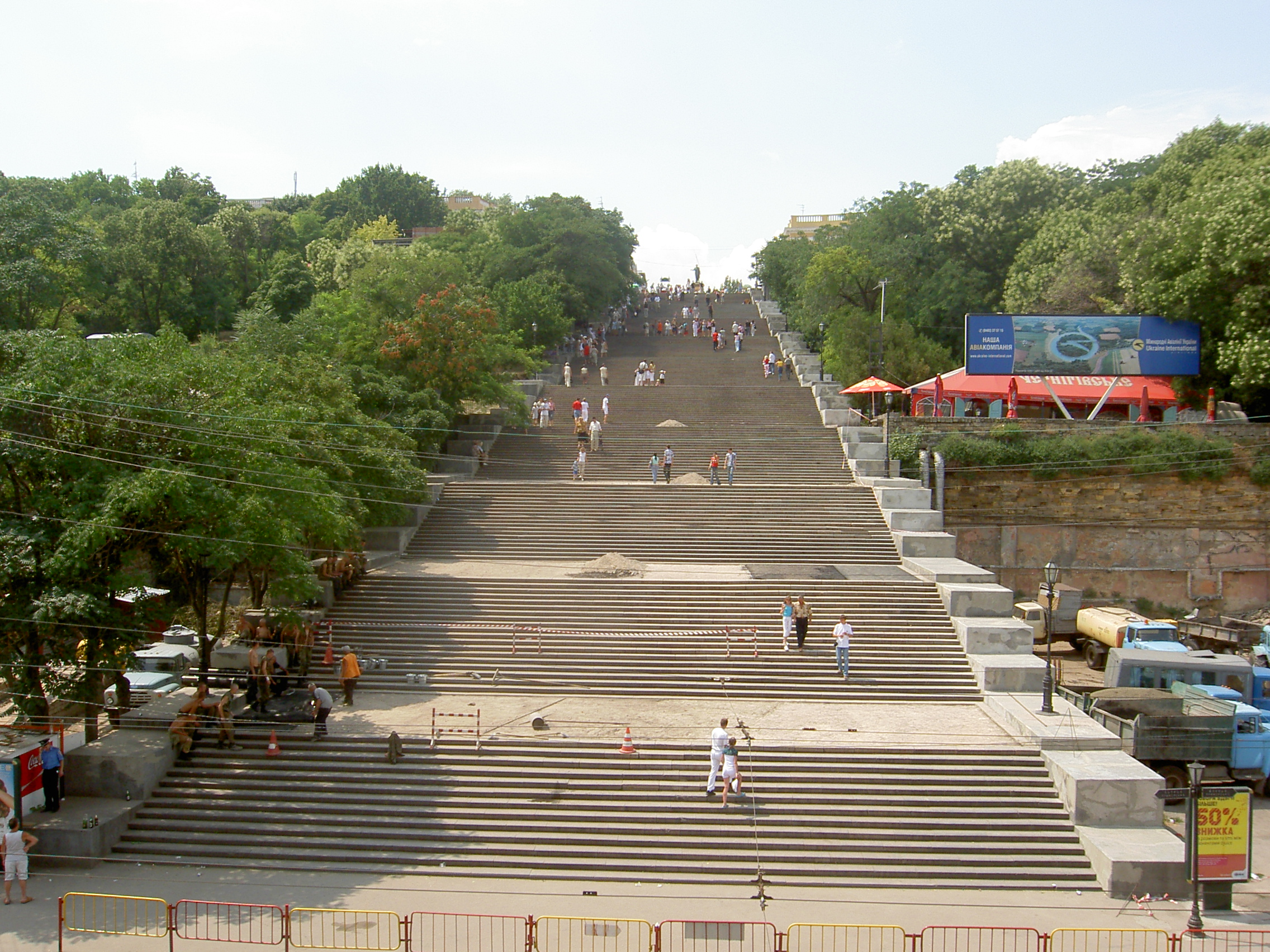
The Potemkin Stairs in Odesa extend for 142 metres (466 ft), but give the illusion of greater depth since the stairs are wider at the bottom than at the top.

The technique takes advantage of the visual cues humans use to perceive depth such as angular size, aerial perspective, shading, and relative size. In film, photography and art, perceived object distance is manipulated by altering fundamental monocular cues used to discern the depth of an object in the scene such as aerial perspective, blurring, relative size and lighting. Using these monocular cues in concert with angular size, the eyes can perceive the distance of an object. Artists are able to freely move the visual plane of objects by obscuring these cues to their advantage.

Increasing the object's distance from the audience makes an object appear smaller, its apparent size decreases as distance from the audience increases. This phenomenon is that of the manipulation of angular and apparent size. The Ames room attraction in some museums and amusement parks takes advantage of distance to make people appear different sizes in corners of a room that appears rectangular to the viewer.

A person perceives the size of an object based on the size of the object's image on the retina. This depends solely on the angle created by the rays coming from the topmost and bottommost part of the object that pass through the center of the lens of the eye. The larger the angle an object subtends, the larger the apparent size of the object. The subtended angle increases as the object moves closer to the lens. Two objects with different actual size have the same apparent size when they subtend the same angle. Similarly, two objects of the same actual size can have drastically varying apparent size when they are moved to different distances from the lens.

=== Calculating angular size ===
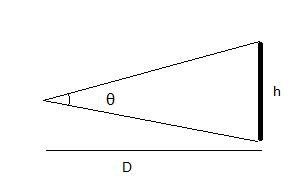
Angular size, distance and object size

The formula for calculating angular size is as follows:

$$\theta=2\cdot\arctan\frac{h}{2D}$$

in which θ is the subtended angle, h is the actual size of the object and D is the distance from the lens to the object.

=== Techniques employed ===
- Solely manipulating angular size by moving objects closer and farther away cannot fully trick the eye. Objects that are farther away from the eye have a lower luminescent contrast due to atmospheric scattering of rays. Fewer rays of light reach the eye from more distant objects. Using the monocular cue of aerial perspective, the eye uses the relative luminescence of objects in a scene to discern relative distance. Filmmakers and photographers combat this cue by manually increasing the luminescence of objects farther away to equal that of objects in the desired plane. This effect is achieved by making the more distant object more bright by shining more light on it. Because luminance decreases by ½d (where d is distance from the eye), artists can calculate the exact amount of light needed to counter the cue of aerial perspective.
- Similarly, blurring can create the opposite effect by giving the impression of depth. Selectively blurring an object moves it out of its original visual plane without having to manually move the object.
- A perceptive illusion that may be infused in film culture is the idea of Gestalt psychology, which holds that people often view the whole of an object as opposed to the sum of its individual parts.
- Another monocular cue of depth perception is that of lighting and shading. Shading in a scene or on an object allows the audience to locate the light source relative to the object. Making two objects at different distances have the same shading gives the impression that they are in similar positions relative to the light source; therefore, they appear closer to each other than they actually are.
- Artists may also employ the simpler technique of manipulating relative size. Once the audience becomes acquainted with the size of an object in proportion to the rest of the objects in a scene, the photographer or filmmaker can replace the object with a larger or smaller replica to change another part of the scene's apparent size. This is done frequently in movies. For example, to aid in the appearance of a person as a giant next to a "regular sized" person, a filmmaker might have a shot of two identical glasses together, then follow with the person who is supposed to play the giant holding a much smaller replica of the glass and the person who is playing the regular-sized person holding a much larger replica. Because the audience sees that the glasses are the same size in the original shot, the difference in relation to the two characters allows the audience to perceive the characters as different sizes based on their relative size to the glasses they hold.
- A painter can give the illusion of distance by adding blue or red tinting to the color of the object he is painting. This monocular cue takes advantage of the trend for the color of distant objects to shift towards the blue end of the spectrum, while the colors of closer objects shift toward the red end of the spectrum. The optical phenomenon is known as chromostereopsis.

=== Examples ===
==== In film ====
Forced perspective has been employed to realize characters in film. One notable example is Rubeus Hagrid, the half-giant in the Harry Potter series.

The technique is used in the Lord of the Rings series for depicting the apparent heights of the hobbit characters, such as Frodo, who are supposed to be around half the height or less of the humans and wizards, such as Gandalf. In reality, the difference in height between the respective actors playing those roles is only 5 inches (13 cm), where Elijah Wood as the hobbit Frodo is 5 ft 6 in (1.68 m) tall, and Ian McKellen as the wizard Gandalf is 5 ft 11 in (1.80 m). The use of camera angles and trick scenery and props creates the illusion of a much greater difference in size and height.

Numerous camera angle tricks are played in the comedy film Elf (2003) to make the elf characters in the movie appear smaller than the human characters.

==== In art ====
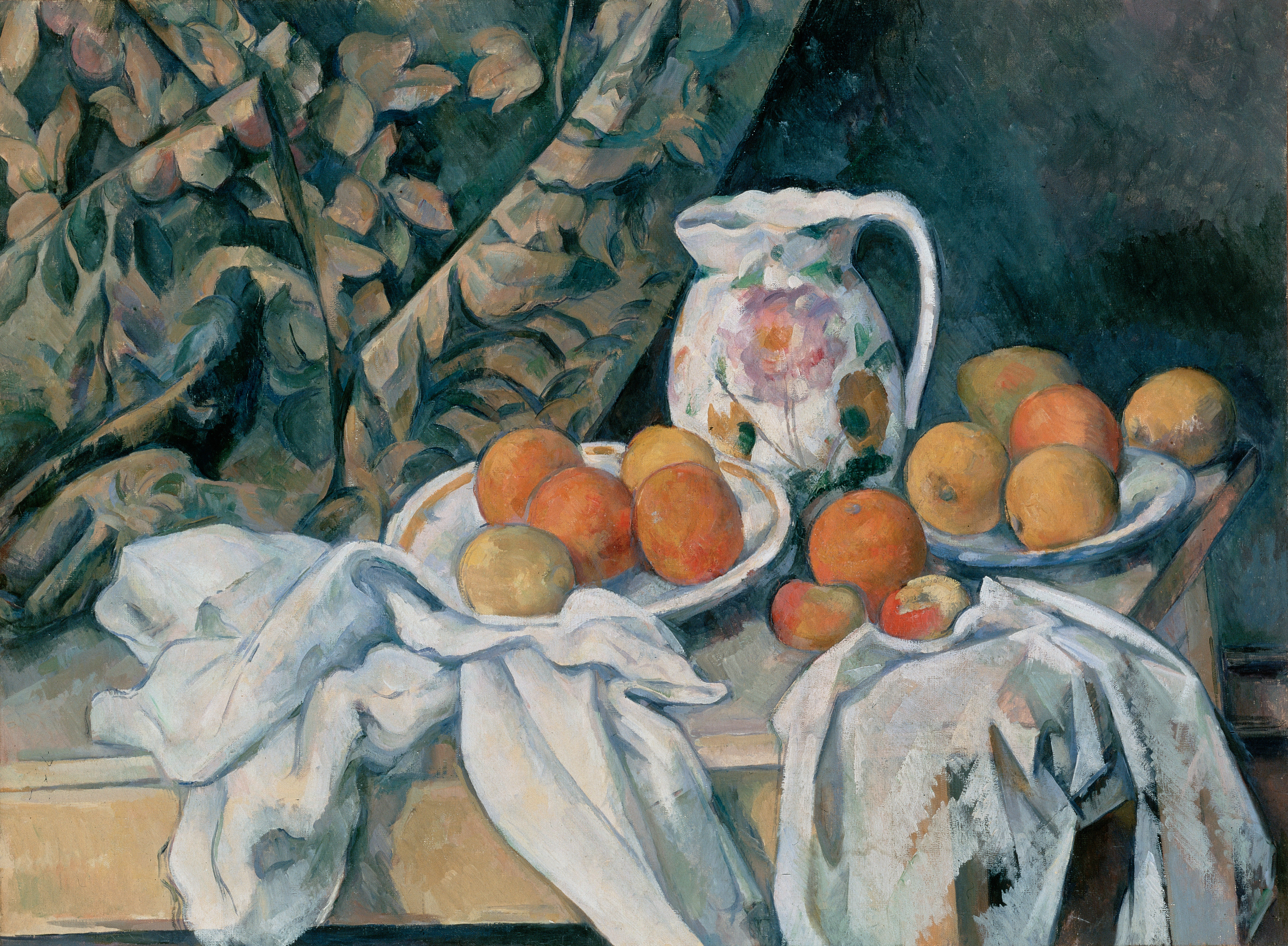
Still life with a curtain

In his painting entitled Still life with a curtain, Paul Cézanne creates the illusion of depth by using brighter colors on objects closer to the viewer and dimmer colors and shading to distance the "light source" from objects that he wanted to appear farther away. His shading technique allows the audience to discern the distance between objects due to their relative distances from a stationary light source that illuminates the scene. Furthermore, he uses a blue tint on objects that should be farther away and redder tint to objects in the foreground.

==== Full size dioramas ====
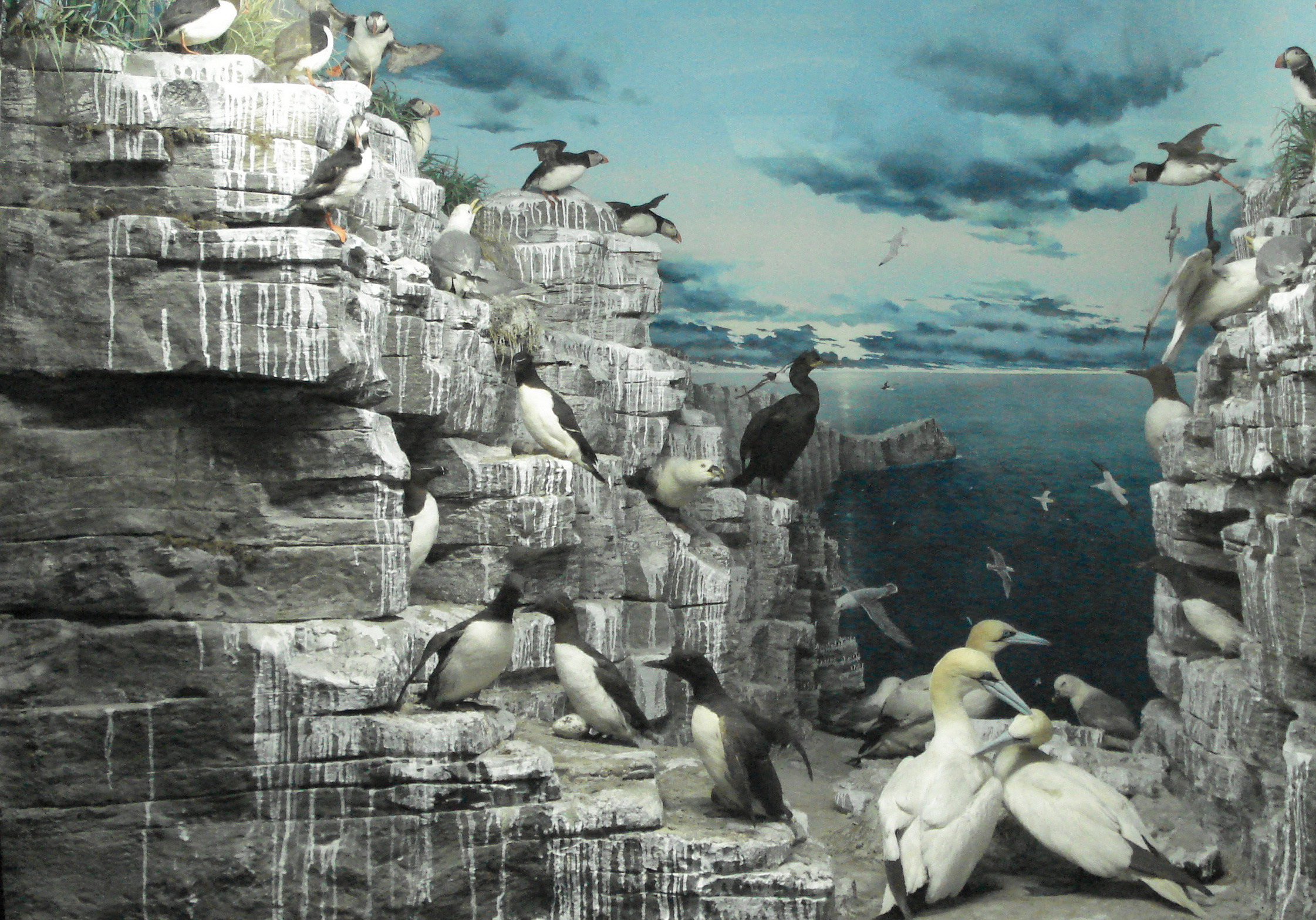
A diorama in the Museum of Natural History in Milan (Italy)

Modern museum dioramas may be seen in most major natural history museums. Typically, these displays use a tilted plane to represent what would otherwise be a level surface, incorporate a painted background of distant objects, and often employ false perspective, carefully modifying the scale of objects placed on the plane to reinforce the illusion through depth perception in which objects of identical real-world size placed farther from the observer appear smaller than those closer. Often the distant painted background or sky will be painted upon a continuous curved surface so that the viewer is not distracted by corners, seams, or edges. All of these techniques are means of presenting a realistic view of a large scene in a compact space. A photograph or single-eye view of such a diorama can be especially convincing since in this case there is no distraction by the binocular perception of depth.

Carl Akeley, a naturalist, sculptor, and taxidermist, is credited with creating the first ever habitat diorama in the year 1889. Akeley's diorama featured taxidermied beavers in a three-dimensional habitat with a realistic, painted background. With the support of curator Frank M. Chapman, Akeley designed the popular habitat dioramas featured at the American Museum of Natural History. Combining art with science, these exhibitions were intended to educate the public about the growing need for habitat conservation. The modern AMNH Exhibitions Lab is charged with the creation of all dioramas and otherwise immersive environments in the museum.

==== Theme parks ====
Forced perspective is extensively employed at theme parks and other such architecture as found in Disneyland and Las Vegas, often to make structures seem larger than they are in reality where physically larger structures would not be feasible or desirable, or to otherwise provide an optical illusion for entertainment value. Most notably, it is used by Walt Disney Imagineering in the Disney Theme Parks. Some notable examples of forced perspective in the parks, used to make the objects bigger, are the castles (Sleeping Beauty, Cinderella, Belle, Magical Dreams, and Enchanted Storybook). One of the most notable examples of forced perspective being used to make the object appear smaller is The American Adventure pavilion in Epcot.

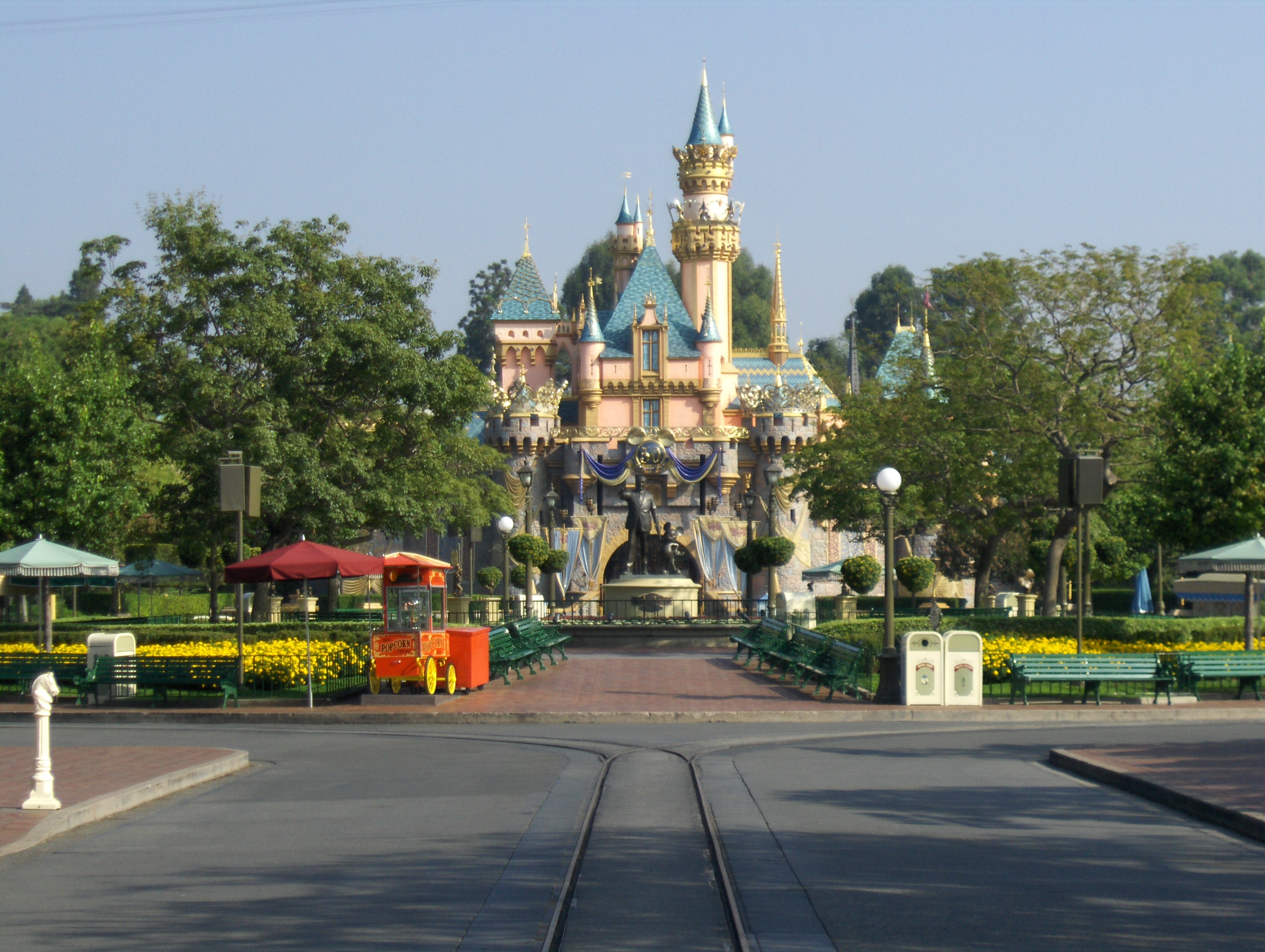
At Sleeping Beauty Castle in Disneyland, the scale of architectural elements is much smaller in the upper reaches of the castle compared to the foundation, making it seem significantly taller than its actual height of 77 feet (23 meters).

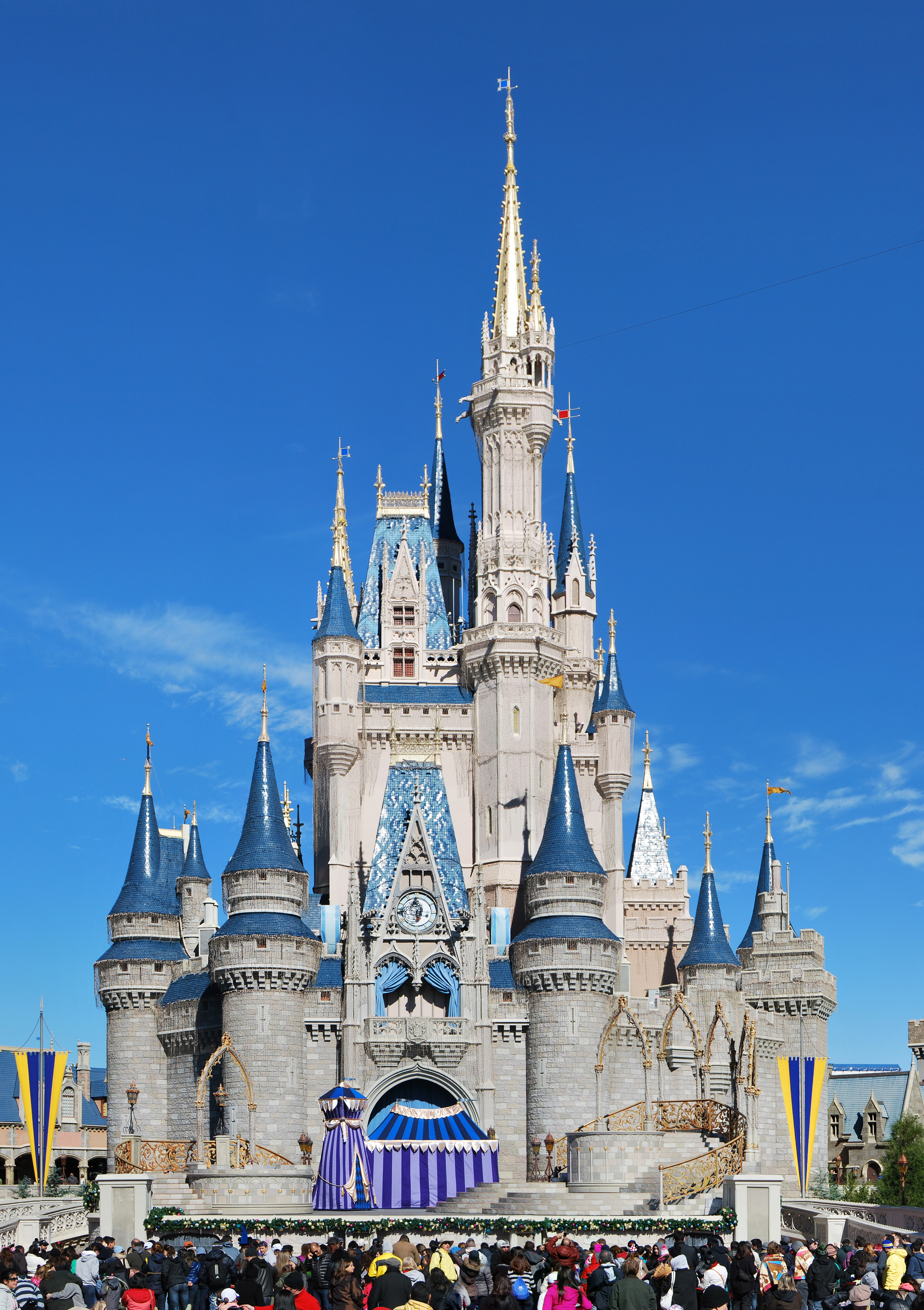
At Cinderella Castle in Walt Disney World's Magic Kingdom, the scale once again gets smaller the higher one goes, making it seem significantly taller than its actual height of 189 feet (58 meters).

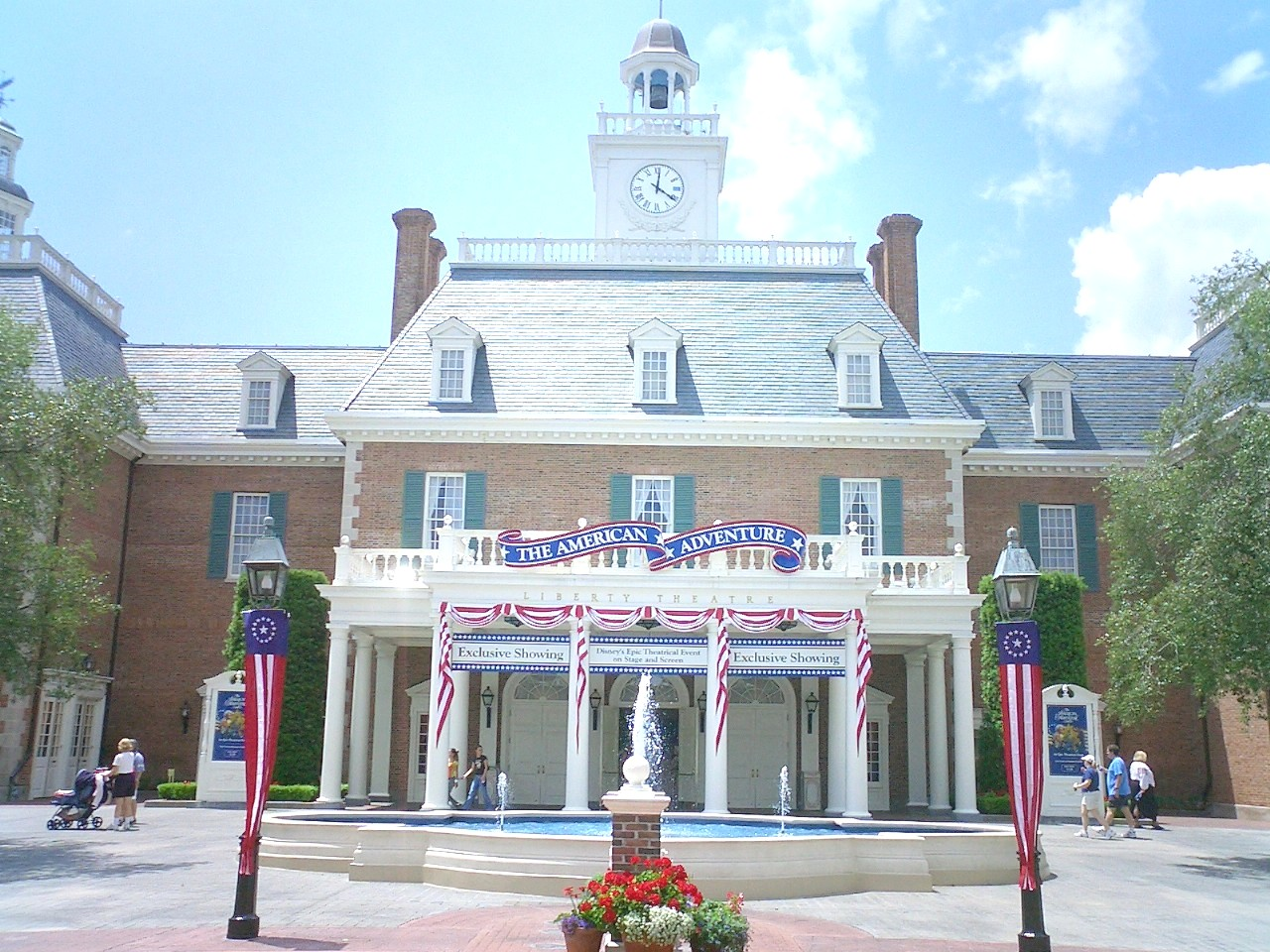
The American Adventure pavilion in Epcot, also in Walt Disney World, uses forced perspective to make a two-story building appear to be three stories.

== See also ==
- Miniature faking
- Ames room
- Anamorphosis
- Depth perception
- Perspective distortion
- Telephoto compression
- Trompe-l'œil
- Vista paradox
