= Globe effect =

Optical illusion

The globe effect, also known as rolling ball effect, is an optical illusion which can occur with optical instruments used visually, in particular binoculars or telescopes. If such an instrument is rectilinear, or free of rectilinear distortion, some observers get the impression of an image rolling on a convex surface when the instrument is panned.

== Origin of the globe effect ==
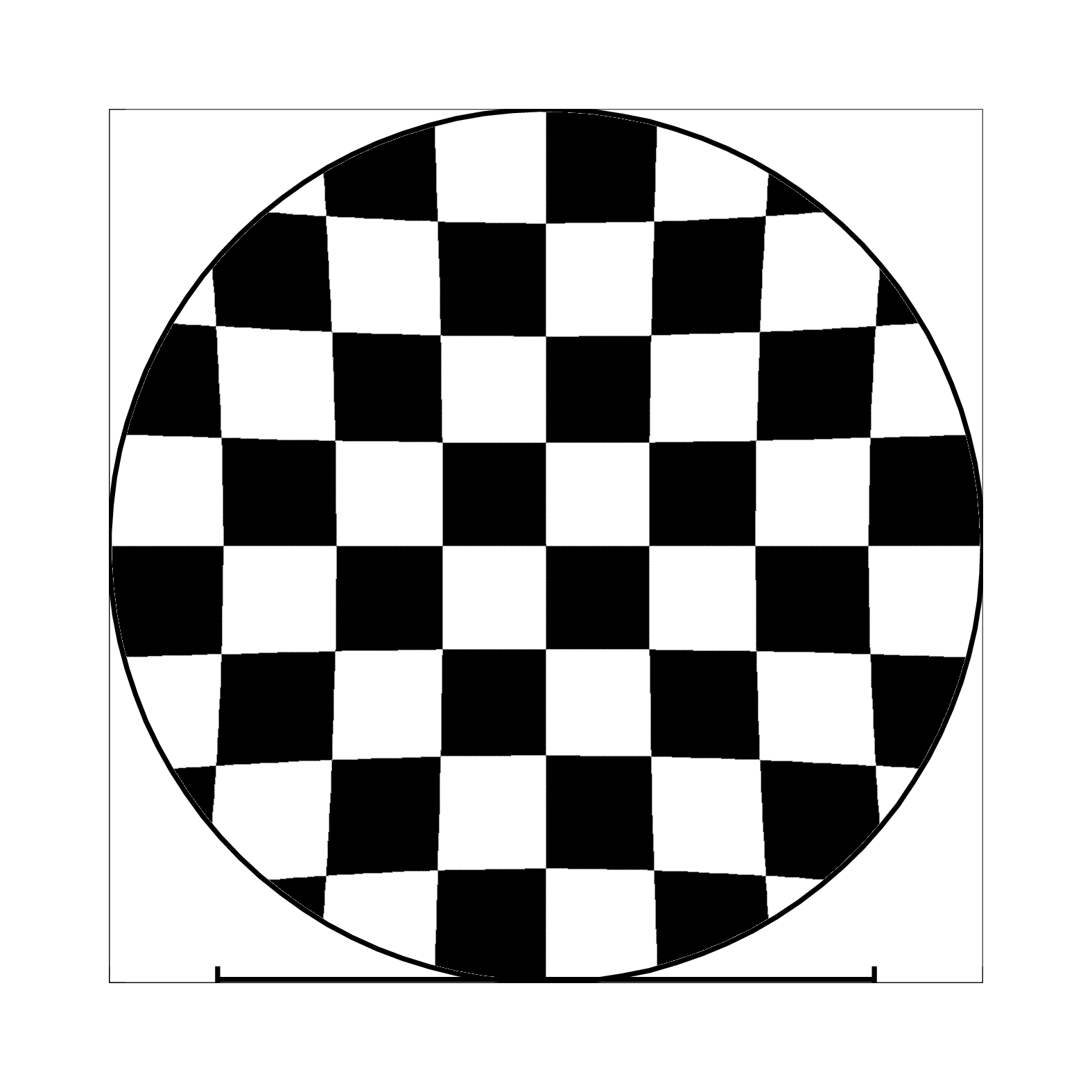
Fig. 1: Helmholtz checkerboard with pincushion distortion. Sufficiently enlarged, it should be viewed from a distance corresponding to the length of the bar (at the lower edge of the image). The view should be left fixed on the center and the bending of the contours should be assessed in indirect vision

The cause of the globe effect has been related to a non-vanishing barrel distortion generated in the process of visual perception: Already Helmholtz had constructed pincushion-distorted checkerboard patterns that he claimed to appear regular when viewed from a certain distance. More recently, systematic studies investigated the barrel distortion of human perception in test subjects and found that it is subject to a high statistical variance, i. e. varying greatly from individual to individual. The average degree of distortion is about half of the value suggested by Helmholtz, so that a large proportion of viewers are likely to perceive only an incomplete compensation of the bent edges in the Helmholtz checkerboard.

The perceptual barrel distortion is sufficiently small to be unnoticeable in everyday life. However, if a rectilinear magnifying optical instrument is panned over a flat motif, the image pixels pass in front of the eye in rapid succession and the visual barrel distortion becomes visible as an apparent convex curvature of the image. This optical illusion remains hidden to the unarmed eye when turning the head, because it is prevented by the vestibulo-ocular reflex.

== Formal Description ==
Fig. 2a: Animation of a regular grid after transformation with Eq. (5) and the parameter choices $k = 1$ (rectilinear imaging), magnification $m = 10$ and $l = 0.6$.

Fig. 2b: An instrumental pincushion distortion of $k = 0.7$ leads to an almost complete elimination of the globe effect.

The image of an afocal optical instrument is distortion-free if the f-tan theta condition, also known as tangent condition and first defined by Bow and Sutton in 1861, is satisfied:

$$\tan a = m \tan A. \qquad (1)$$

Here, $a$ is the beam inclination with respect to the optical axis on the image side, and $A$ the beam inclination on the object side (or: subjective viewing angle of the image in the eyepiece and the inclination of the object with respect to the viewing direction), and $m$ is the magnification of the instrument. This relationship applies to all directions, so that the image is centrally symmetrical.

To obtain a convenient parameterization of the degree of distortion, we introduce the general relationship

$$\tan (ka) = m \tan (kA), \qquad (2)$$

with the distortion parameter $k \in [0, 1]$. This yields the f-tan theta condition (1) in the special case $k = 1$. The case $k = 0.5$ is known as the circle condition and provides the pincushion-distorted pattern which was implemented by Helmholtz in his checkerboard. Yet another limit case with $k \rightarrow 0$ leads to the f-theta condition (also known as angle condition)

$$a = mA, \qquad (3)$$

which produces a considerably stronger pincushion distortion. The meaning of the infinite set of curves spanned by the distortion parameter is thus clear: Starting with the value 1, a reduction of $k$ produces an increasingly stronger pincushion distortion, which reaches its highest value at $k = 0$.

At this point, another distortion is needed, which originates from the observer's visual perception. For this purpose, perceptual psychology introduces an abstract visual space whose properties are defined by mathematical modeling. In order to create a barrel distortion of varying strength, we define

$$y = l^{-1} \tan(la), \qquad (4)$$

where $l \in [0,1]$ is the visual distortion parameter and $y$ is the subjectively perceived distance of an image point to the center of the field, as it is observed through the instrumental eyepiece. Our model for the perception is now based on a two-stage process: The real object is inclined by the angle $A$ to the principal axis, and this inclination is transformed by the instrument to the subjective angle $a$ in the virtual image, as a result of the magnification and any instrumental distortion. The observer's perception then maps this subjective angle into the actually perceived distance $y$ to the center of the field. The limit case $l = 1$ implies $y = \tan a$ and thus absence of any further distortion, while the opposite limit case, $l \rightarrow 0$, leads to $y = a$, in which the perceived distance to the center is proportional to the angle. We obtain the combined effect of instrumental and visual imaging after resolving Eq. (2) according to the subjective angle $a$, and inserting the result into Eq. (4), yielding

$$y = l^{-1} \tan \left\{ \frac{l}{k} \arctan [m \tan (kA)]   \right\}. \qquad (5)$$

With suitable combinations of the parameters $m$, $k$ and $l$, the globe effect emerges in the panning instrument (Fig. 2a).

Remarks:

- The choice $k \approx l$ generally leads to a compensation of the globe effect. Exceptions exist in cases of low magnifications at very large objective angles, which occur, for example, with opera glasses, low-power digital observation devices, or head-mounted displays.
- Since the strength of the visual distortion $l$ is subject to individual variation, observers perceive the globe effect with varying intensity or not at all.
- A regular grid, as shown in Fig. 2b, is only visible as long as the observer's gaze remains fixed on the center of the field of view (cross), otherwise the bent lines of the pincushion distortion would become visible.
- The case $m=1$, i. e. an instrument without magnification, yields with Eq. (5) $y = l^{-1} \tan(lA)$, which is of the same functional form as the original visual imaging rule (4), after the subjective angle has been replaced by the object angle. This is how the unarmed eye sees the world.
- If the instrument is panned rather slowly, the impression of the globe effect vanishes as a result of the optokinetic nystagmus.
- It can be shown that the case $k = 1$ corresponds to a virtual image of flat Euclidean geometry, whereas the case $k = 0$ yields a spherical geometry. The same applies accordingly to the visual space.
- Not always is the distortion curve of an optical instrument accurately parameterized with Eq. (2), a notable exception being the case of mustache distortion. Nevertheless, any parameterization of the curve $a(A)$ can be inserted into the transformation formula (5) and then the panning behavior of the optics assessed by computer animation.

== Constructive measures against the globe effect using the example of current binoculars ==
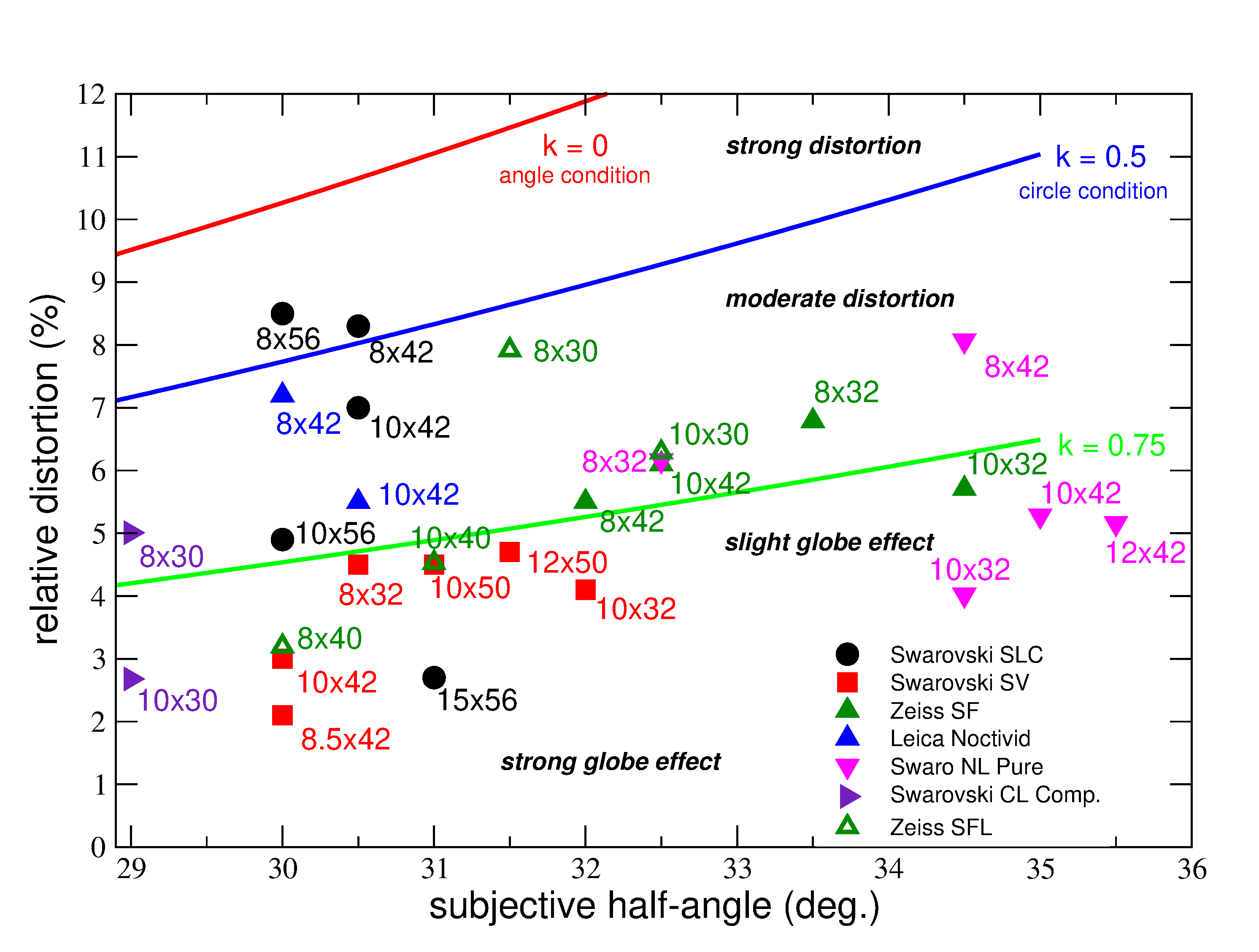
Fig. 3: Relative distortion of binoculars of recent manufacture (2009–2022).

Until the middle of the twentieth century, binoculars and telescopes were usually designed according to the specifications of Bow and Sutton with as little distortion as possible. Systematic studies on the role of distortion in visual optical instruments, carried out by the Zeiss employees Slevogt and Sonnefeld, prompted Zeiss around 1949 to introduce a nominal pincushion distortion into the optical calculation of the eyepieces, initially orienting itself on the angle condition (3). Even if the perceptual psychological background of the globe effect was not yet known at that time, the advantage of this measure in the form of a 'calmer image' during panning was already emphasized by Köhler and König. The majority of optics manufacturers worldwide followed Zeiss' example, which is evident from the pronounced pincushion distortions present in binoculars of this period. In the early years of the twenty-first century, some Japanese manufacturers - notably Nikon and Fujinon, and from 2010 increasingly also the European manufacturers - began to significantly reduce the nominal pincushion distortion in some of their high-end products. In 2009, Swarovski also began to publish the actual subjective viewing angles of their binoculars. Previously, these had only been calculated, mostly under the assumption of the angle condition (3) or - as by Nikon even today - according to the tangent condition (1), in this case also known as the industry standard ISO 14132-1:2002. Zeiss and Leica followed this example with some of their recent models. The specification of the subjective angle of view, i. e. the maximum value of $a$, allows the relative distortion of the binoculars to be computed according to the definition

$$V_r = \frac{\frac{\tan a}{\tan A} - m}{m} \qquad (6)$$

from the specifications of the data sheets. For comparison, Figure 3 shows the curves $V_r(a)$ for different values of the distortion parameter $k$. The data points show that with recent binoculars, distortions in the vicinity of the angle condition (red curve) no longer occur, even the circle condition (blue) as propagated by Helmholtz and Slevogt is undercut by almost all models. The distortion values of modern binoculars are grouped (with considerable variance) around the parameter value $k \approx 0.75$ (green), which corresponds to only slightly more than half the distortion of the circle condition. This value is consistent with the average visual distortion as reported in the study by Oomes, which may indicate that some manufacturers are already putting the findings of current perceptual psychology studies into practice.

Remarks:

- When computing Eq. (6) from the manufacturer's specifications, there are often uncertainties due to rounded and therefore imprecise specifications in their data sheets.
- For binoculars with distortion curves that cannot be approximately parameterized by Eq. (2), a given specification of the relative distortion does not allow any conclusions to be drawn about the panning behavior. As is customary in the camera industry, manufacturers should publish the distortion curves of their optics in order to rule out these uncertainties.
- The curve $k = 0.75$ (green) in Fig. 3 corresponds to an approximation in which the objective half-angle $A$ was assumed to be sufficiently small to expand the trigonometric function in a linear approximation. The magnification is thereby eliminated as a parameter.
- In a patent filed by Leica in 2020 for a digital telescope, the distortion parameter $k$ is designed to be freely adjustable so that each observer can achieve the ideal compensation of the globe effect individually. Furthermore, the instrument will be able to recognize the observation mode with the help of a motion or acceleration sensor and then automatically switch from a low distortion (during static observation) to a higher distortion (during panning).
- Interesting historical background on the subject from the point of view of the Zeiss Group can be found on the website of A. Köhler, and in the book of R. Riekher (both in German language).

== Alternative approach to explain the globe effect ==
An alternative approach for explaining the globe effect comes from the technical journalist and optics specialist Walter E. Schön. He states that the observed effect is in fact not that of a rolling globe but that of a vertically rotating cylinder. The globe shape of the illusion seen by most observers is only because the field of view through the optical device is circular. This illusion of a rotating cylinder during panning is caused by the horizontal movement of the image being (due to the angular magnification of the device) faster and more uniform (with less parallax) compared to the naked eye and also not corresponding to the felt rotational speed of the observer's head. When the brain tries to integrate these conflicting signals, it creates the perception that the image is moving slower at the left and right edges than in the middle, giving the illusion of a rotating cylinder. In this sense, it has been proposed to use cylindrical optical elements to reduce the globe effect only for horizontal panning, which is the dominant direction of motion in most applications. A disadvantage of this approach is that it does not allow any quantitative predictions to be made about the measures to avoid the globe effect, and that it breaks the centrally symmetrical property of the imaging process.

== Bibliography ==
- Merlitz, Holger (2023). The Binocular Handbook. Springer Cham. doi:10.1007/978-3-031-44408-1. ISBN 978-3-031-44407-4.
- Yoder, Jr., Paul R.; Vukobratovich, Daniel (2011). Field Guide to Binoculars and Scopes. SPIE PRESS. ISBN 9780819486493.

== See also ==
- geometrical optics
