= Texture gradient =

Distortion in size which closer objects have compared to objects farther away

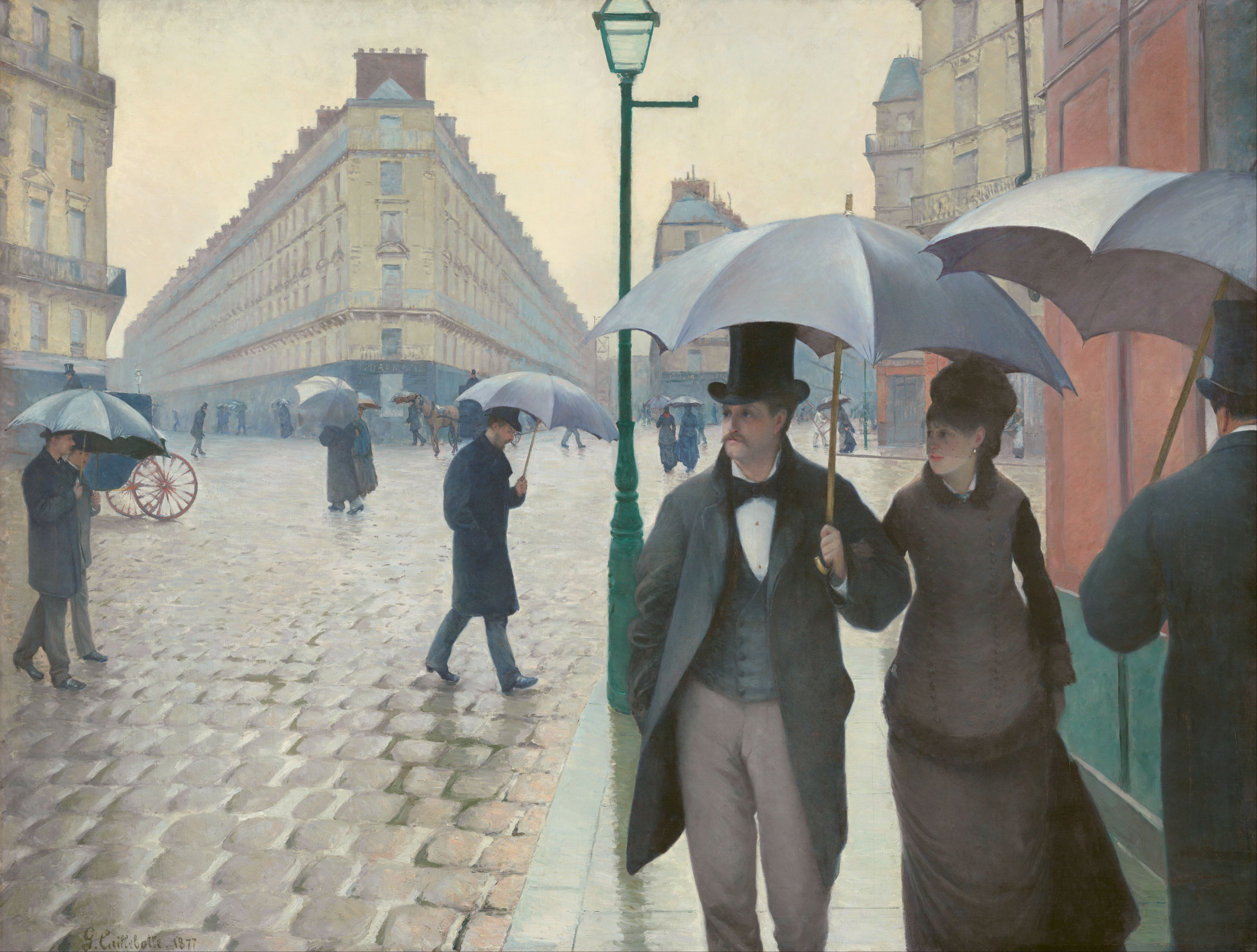
Gustave Caillebotte. Paris Street, Rainy Day, 1877, Art Institute of Chicago

Texture gradient is the distortion in size which closer objects have compared to objects further away. It also involves groups of objects appearing denser as they move further away. Additionally, it could be explained by noticing a certain amount of detail depending on how close something is, giving a sense of depth perception. There are three main forms of texture gradient: density, perspective, and distortion of texture elements.

Texture gradient is carefully used in the painting Paris Street, Rainy Day by Gustave Caillebotte.

Texture gradient was used in a study of child psychology in 1976 and studied by Sidney Weinstein in 1957.

In 2000, a paper about the texture gradient equation, wavelets, and shape from texture was released by Maureen Clerc and Stéphane Mallat.

== See also ==
- Texture (visual arts)
- Image gradient
- Perspective distortion
