= Telephoto compression =

Apparent reduction of distance between objects in photographs

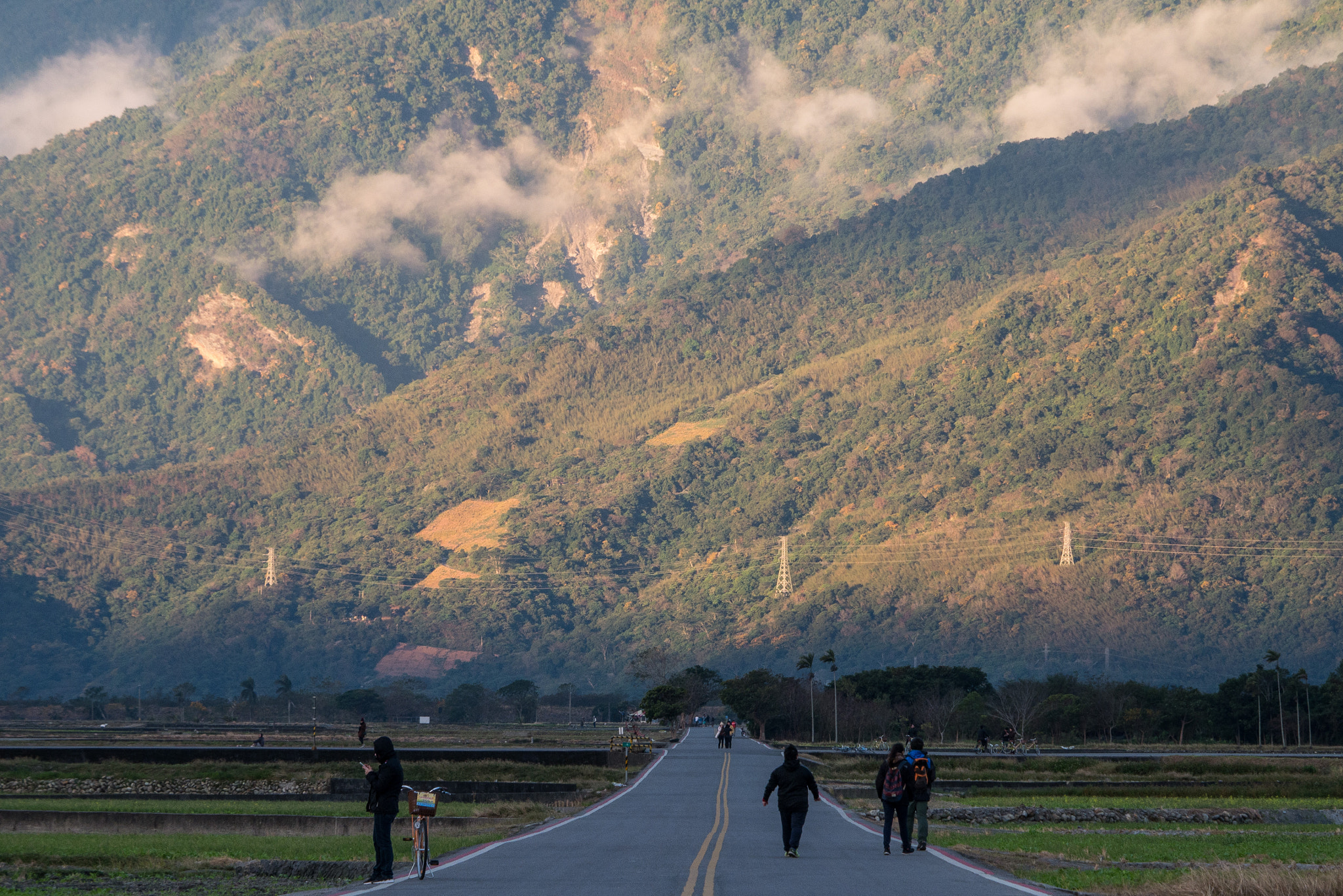
Telephoto compression causes a road in Chishang to appear as though it passes directly through distant paddy fields and mountains.

Telephoto compression (also known as lens compression or perspective compression) is the apparent visual effect in photography and cinematography in which distant objects appear larger relative to nearby objects, making the distance between them appear reduced. The effect is commonly associated with the use of long-focal length (telephoto) lenses, although it is primarily caused by the camera's increased distance from the subject rather than the optical properties of the lens itself. A telephoto lens allows photographers to achieve the required framing while positioned farther away, making the effect more apparent.

== Characteristics ==
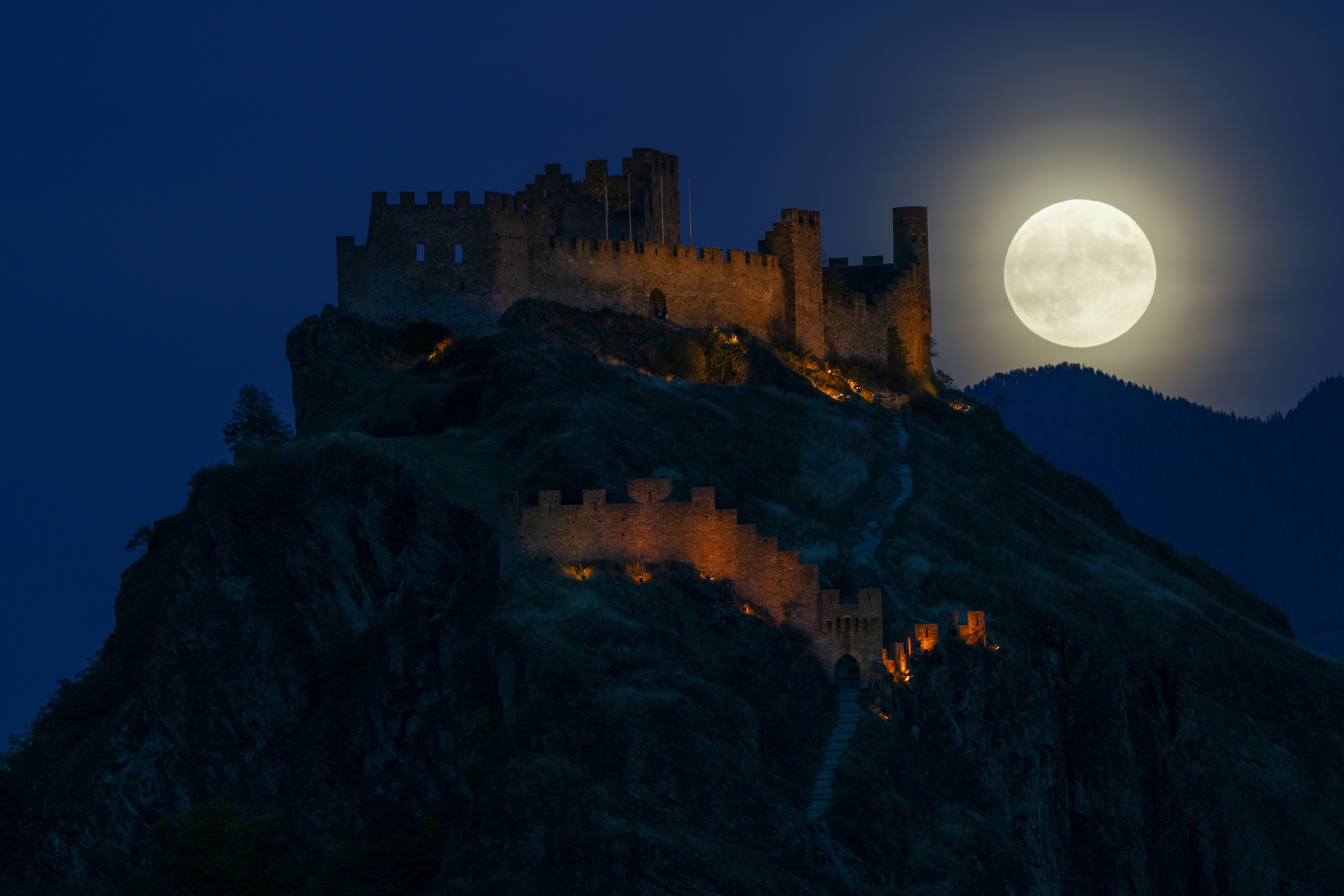
The full moon appearing unusually large behind Tourbillon Castle due to telephoto compression.

Telephoto compression results from the principles of linear perspective. As the camera moves farther from the subject, the difference in viewing angle between foreground and background objects decreases. This reduces the apparent difference in their sizes, making distant objects appear larger and closer to foreground subjects. Contrary to common belief, the effect is not created by the telephoto lens itself. If the same scene is photographed from the same camera position using different focal lengths and the images are cropped to the same field of view, the perspective remains identical. The telephoto lens merely enables the photographer to maintain the desired framing while photographing from a greater distance. The phenomenon is widely used in landscape, architectural, wildlife and sports photography to visually emphasise distant backgrounds, such as mountains, the Moon or skylines appearing close to foreground subjects.

=== Photographic uses ===
Telephoto compression is widely employed in advertising, travel photography, film production and television broadcasts. The effect is frequently used for artistic and practical purposes, including:

- emphasising mountain ranges behind a landscape or city
- making the Moon or Sun appear unusually large behind foreground subjects
- highlighting dense urban skylines by visually reducing the spacing between buildings
- portraying vehicles, runners or cyclists as closely grouped in sporting events
- compressing rows of trees, utility poles or architectural elements to create repeating patterns

== Misconceptions ==
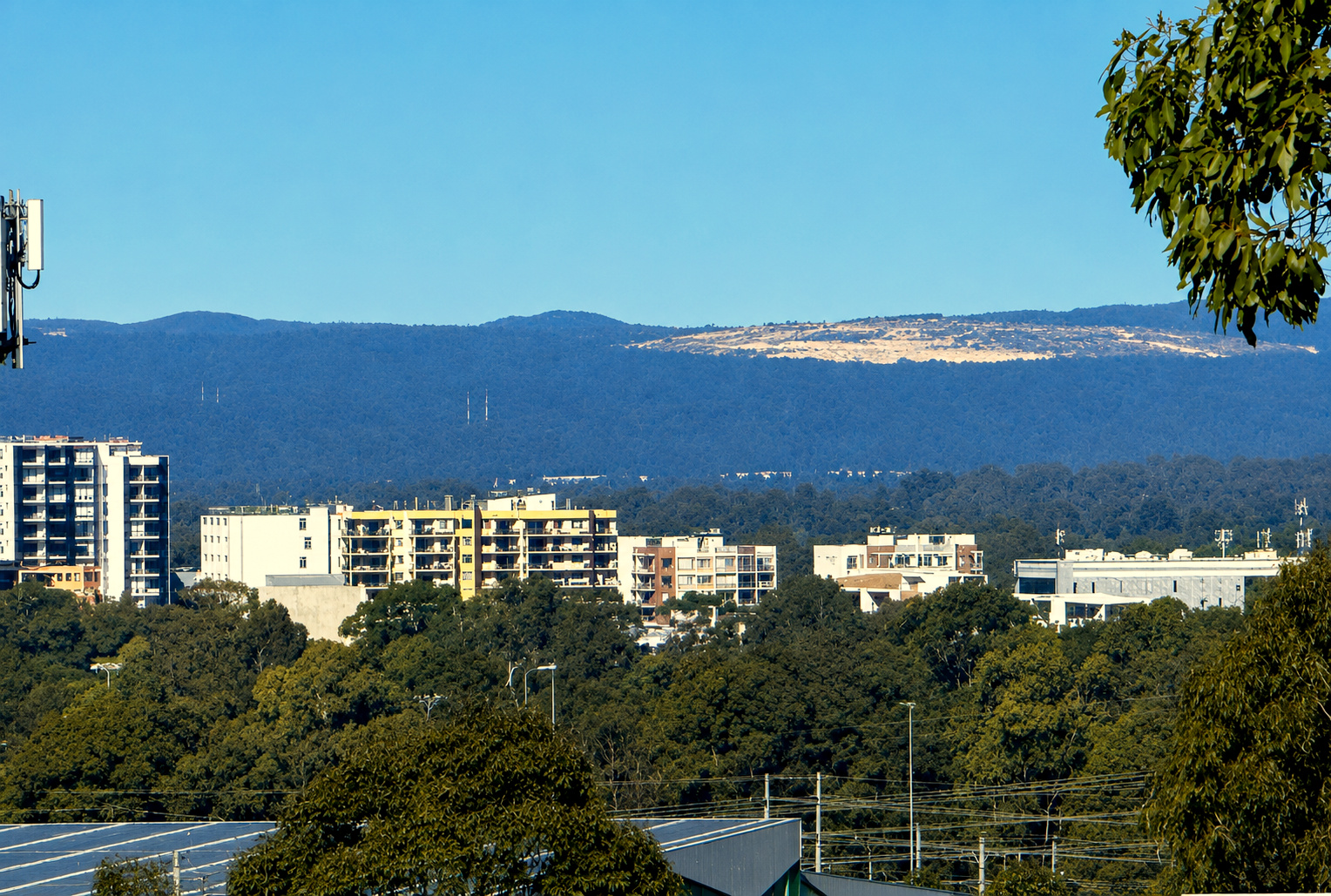
Lucas Heights (background), about 18 kilometres (11 mi) south of Fairfield (centre), appearing much closer than its actual distance.

Telephoto compression is often incorrectly described as a property of telephoto lenses. In reality, perspective is determined solely by the camera's position relative to the scene. Changing focal length without moving the camera alters only the field of view and magnification. The apparent compression occurs because photographers using long focal lengths typically position themselves farther from the subject to achieve the desired composition. Telephoto compression is the opposite visual effect of the exaggerated perspective commonly associated with wide-angle lenses. While wide-angle photographs taken from close distances make nearby objects appear disproportionately large and distant objects much smaller, photographs taken from greater distances reduce these size differences, producing the appearance of a compressed scene.

In Perspective Compression by a Telephoto Lens: A Myth (2002), Craig Williams argued that the term "telephoto compression" is misleading because the effect is not produced by the lens itself. He explained that perspective is determined by camera position, while changes in focal length affect only framing and magnification. According to Williams, telephoto lenses merely enable photographers to achieve the desired framing from a greater distance.

In an interview published by PhotoShelter, mathematician Fumiko Futamura explained the phenomenon using principles of projective geometry, describing the term "lens compression" as misleading because perspective is governed by camera position rather than the optical properties of the lens.

== Public perception ==
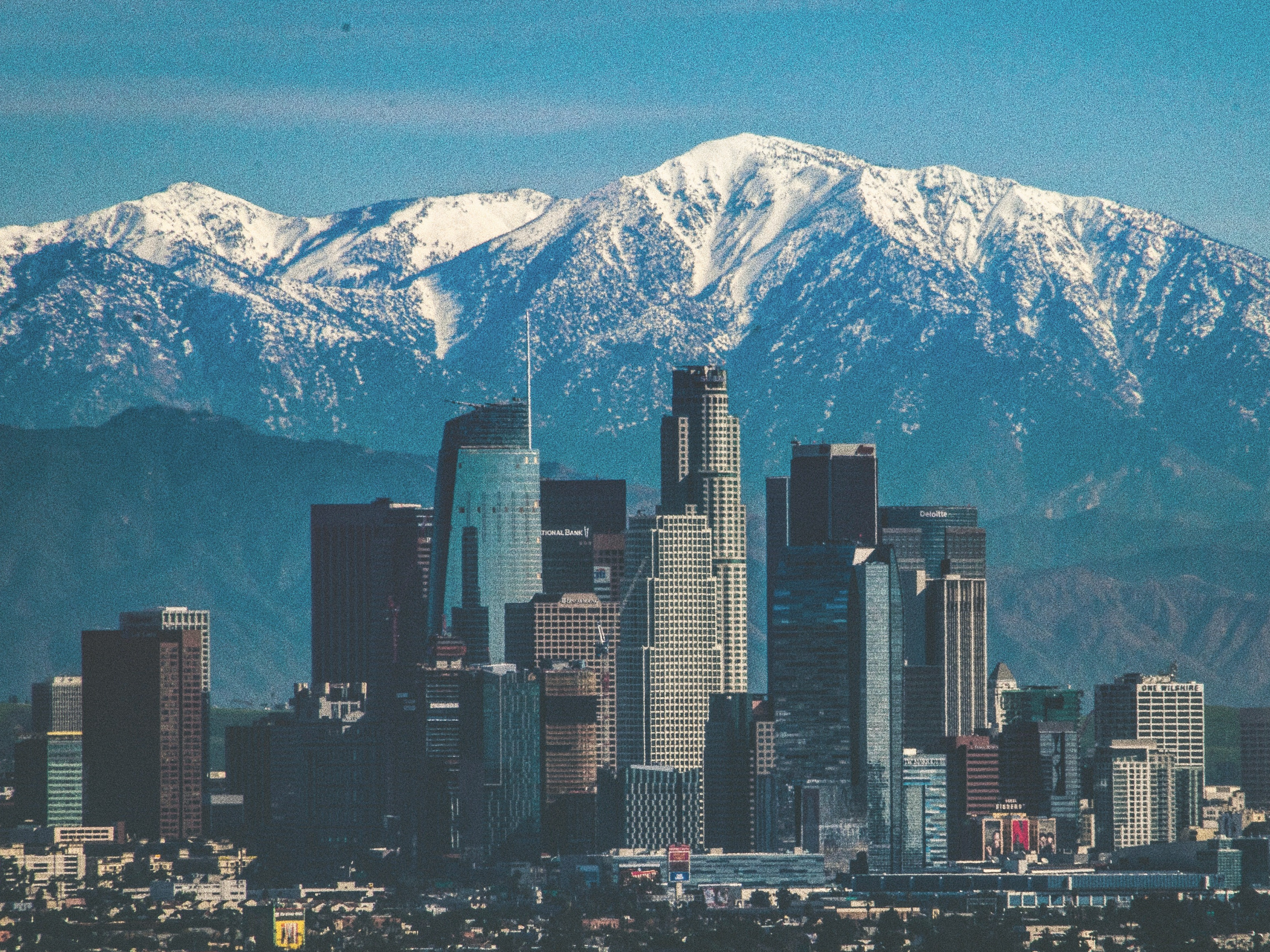
The San Gabriel Mountains appearing directly behind the Downtown Los Angeles due to telephoto compression.

During the COVID-19 pandemic, telephoto compression received widespread public attention after news photographs of crowded beaches, parks and public spaces appeared to show people standing much closer together than they actually were. Images captured with long focal length lenses from a considerable distance compressed the apparent spacing between individuals, creating the impression that physical distancing guidelines were being ignored. Media organisations and photography experts noted that while some images accurately depicted overcrowding, others exaggerated the perceived density of crowds because of perspective compression rather than actual proximity between people. The phenomenon prompted greater public discussion about the effects of camera perspective on the interpretation of news photographs.

In 2019, Liyu Wu, an aviation photographer, captured a widely circulated photograph of three Airbus A400M Atlas transport aircraft and several Pilatus PC-7 trainer aircraft of the Royal Malaysian Air Force performing a formation break at the Langkawi International Maritime and Aerospace Exhibition. Owing to telephoto compression and the timing of the photograph, the aircraft appeared much closer together than they were in reality, despite travelling in different directions. The image has frequently been cited as an example of how telephoto compression can dramatically alter the perceived spacing between distant objects.

In 2021, a photograph by Alyssa Chiampi depicting the Moon appearing directly behind One World Trade Center attracted widespread attention online. Captured from approximately 25 miles (40 km) away using a super-telephoto lens, the image relied on careful planning and telephoto compression to make the Moon appear nearly as large as the skyscraper. The photograph has been cited as an example of how camera distance and perspective can dramatically alter the apparent size and spacing of distant objects without digital manipulation.

== See also ==
- Perspective (graphical)
- Perspective distortion (photography)
- Telephoto lens
- Focal length
- Wide-angle lens
- Forced perspective
