= Perspective distortion =

Distortion of an object in photography

Simulation showing how adjusting the angle of view of a camera, while varying the camera's distance and keeping the object in frame, results in vastly differing images. At narrow angles and long distances, light rays are nearly parallel, resulting in a "flattened" image. At wide angles and short distances, objects appear foreshortened or distorted. The opposite limit of 0° and infinite distance yields an axonometric projection.

In photography and cinematography, perspective distortion is a warping or transformation of an object and its surrounding area that differs significantly from what the object would look like with a normal focal length, due to the relative scale of nearby and distant features. Perspective distortion is determined by the relative distances at which the image is captured and viewed, and is due to the angle of view of the image (as captured) being either wider or narrower than the angle of view at which the image is viewed, hence the apparent relative distances differing from what is expected. Related to this concept is axial magnification – the perceived depth of objects at a given magnification.

Perspective distortion takes two forms: extension distortion and compression distortion, also called wide-angle distortion and long-lens or telephoto distortion, when talking about images with the same field size. Extension or wide-angle distortion can be seen in images shot from close using a wide-angle lens (with an angle of view wider than a normal lens). Objects close to the lens appear abnormally large relative to more distant objects, and distant objects appear abnormally small and hence farther away – distances are extended. Compression, long-lens, or telephoto distortion can be seen in images shot from a distance using a long focus lens or the more common telephoto sub-type (with an angle of view narrower than a normal lens). Distant objects look approximately the same size – closer objects are abnormally small, and more distant objects are abnormally large, and hence the viewer cannot discern relative distances between distant objects – distances are compressed.

Note that linear perspective changes are caused by distance, not by the lens per se – two shots of the same scene from the same distance will exhibit identical perspective geometry, regardless of lens used. However, since wide-angle lenses have a wider field of view, they are generally used from closer, while telephoto lenses have a narrower field of view and are generally used from farther away. For example, if standing at a distance so that a normal lens captures someone's face, a shot with a wide-angle lens or telephoto lens from the same distance will have exactly the same linear perspective geometry on the face, though the wide-angle lens may fit the entire body into the shot, while the telephoto lens captures only the nose. However, crops of these three images with the same coverage will yield the same perspective distortion – the nose will look the same in all three. Conversely, if all three lenses are used from distances such that the face fills the field, the wide-angle will be used from closer, making the nose larger compared to the rest of the photo, and the telephoto will be used from farther, making the nose smaller compared to the rest of the photo.

Outside photography, extension distortion is familiar to many through side-view mirrors (see "objects in mirror are closer than they appear") and peepholes, though these often use a fisheye lens, exhibiting different distortion. Compression distortion is most familiar in looking through binoculars or telescopes, as in telescopic sights, while a similar effect is seen in fixed-slit strip photography, notably a photo finish, where all capture is parallel to the capture, eliminating perspective (a side view).

== History ==
The concept of perspective distortion has fascinated artists, architects, and scientists for centuries, evolving alongside the development of visual culture and optical theory. Perspective distortion refers to the manipulation of visual perception through deliberate techniques that create altered or exaggerated views of objects or scenes. This concept has not only shaped art and architecture but has also played a critical role in challenging and expanding the limits of human perception.

The roots of perspective distortion trace back to ancient civilizations, where early artists sought to represent three-dimensional objects on two-dimensional surfaces. Ancient Egyptian art and Mesopotamian art often featured composite perspectives, blending different viewpoints into a single scene to communicate symbolic or hierarchical meaning. This approach was less about realism and more about conveying importance, with objects or figures often distorted to fit a cultural or narrative framework.

The formalization of linear perspective in Renaissance Europe marked a turning point in the history of perspective distortion. Pioneered by figures like Filippo Brunelleschi and Leon Battista Alberti, linear perspective provided a systematic approach to creating the illusion of depth on flat surfaces. Artists like Leonardo da Vinci and Albrecht Dürer mastered this technique, but others began experimenting with its limits. Anamorphosis, a form of perspective distortion where an image appears distorted unless viewed from a specific angle, emerged during this period. Hans Holbein the Younger’s The Ambassadors (Holbein) (1533) famously employs this technique, featuring a distorted skull visible only when viewed obliquely, symbolizing the transient nature of life.

In the 20th century, perspective distortion expanded into photography and modern art, with wide-angle and telephoto lenses creating exaggerated or compressed views. Photographers like André Kertész used distortion to evoke emotional or psychological responses, while surrealists like Salvador Dalí distorted perspective to challenge reality itself. Fred Leeman’s Hidden Image: Games of Perception delves into how perspective distortion is used for “playful subversion,” encouraging viewers to question their visual assumptions and engage in the active process of interpretation.

== Optics ==
Consider an idealised Gaussian optical system, with the image and the object in the same medium. Thus, for an object in focus, the distance between the lens and image plane $s_\mathrm{i}$, the distance between lens and the object $s_\mathrm{o}$, and the focal length $f$ are related by the thin-lens equation:

$$\frac{1}{s_\mathrm{i}} + \frac{1}{s_\mathrm{o}} = \frac{1}{f}\,.$$
The transverse magnification $M$ is related to

$$M = \frac{s_\mathrm{i}}{s_\mathrm{o}}.$$

Assume the distance between the object and the image plane being $D$,
$$D={s_\mathrm{i}} + {s_\mathrm{o}}.$$

For $D \geq 4f$, let $D_\mathrm{f} = D/f$,

$$M = \frac{D -2 f -\sqrt{{D}^{2} -4 D f}}{2f} = \frac{D_f}{2} -1-\sqrt{\frac{{D_f}^{2}}{4} - D_f}\,.$$

The axial magnification $M_\text{ax}$ of an object at $s_\mathrm{o}$ is the rate of change of the lens–image distance $s_\mathrm{i}$ as the lens–object distance $s_\mathrm{o}$ changes. For an object of finite depth, one can conceive of the average axial magnification as the ratio of the depth of the image and the depth of the object:

$$\begin{align}
M_\text{ax} &= \left| \frac{\mathrm{d}s_\mathrm{i}}{\mathrm{d}s_\mathrm{o}} \right| = \left| \frac{\mathrm{d}}{\mathrm{d}s_\mathrm{o}} \left(\frac{1}{f} - \frac{1}{s_\mathrm{o}}\right)^{-1} \right| \\
&= \left| -\left(\frac{1}{f} - \frac{1}{s_\mathrm{o}}\right)^{-2} s_\mathrm{o}^{-2} \right| \\
&= \frac{s_\mathrm{i}^2}{s_\mathrm{o}^2} = M^2\,.
\end{align}$$

When $M > 1$, as the magnification increases, the ratio of axial to transverse magnification also increases. For example, if $M = 2$, then $M_\text{ax} = 4$, and the image will be twice as tall and four times as deep as the object.

When $D \geq 4f, M \leq 1$ as for most of the camera, if $M = 0.5$, then $M_\text{ax} = 0.25$, and the image will be half as tall and quarter as deep as the object.

At $s_{o}$, the rate of change of the transverse magnification $M$ as $s_{o}$changes：

${M_{s_{o}}=\left|{d \over d(s_{o})}{s_{i} \over s_{o}}\right|=\left|{d \over d(s_{o})}{f \over (s_{o}-f)}\right|=\left|{-f \over (s_{o}-f)^{2}}\right|={M^{2} \over f}}$

It can be seen that, for a fixed $M$, the longer focal length leads to small change of $M$, the shorter focal length leads to big change of $M$. That means to get the same $M$ by moving to the longer focal length, the object changes less, looks more shallow, vice versa.

== Influencing factors ==
Perspective distortion is influenced by the relationship between two factors: the angle of view at which the image is captured by the camera and the angle of view at which the photograph of the subject is presented or viewed.

=== Angle of view of the capture ===
When photographs are viewed at the ordinary viewing distance, the angle of view at which the image is captured accounts completely for the appearance of perspective distortion. The general assumption that "undoctored" photos cannot distort a scene is incorrect. Perspective distortion is particularly noticeable in portraits taken with wide-angle lenses at short camera-to-subject distances. They generally give an unpleasant impression, making the nose appear too large with respect to the rest of the face, and distorting the facial expression. Framing the same subject identically while using a moderate telephoto or long focus lens (with a narrow angle of view) flattens the image to a more flattering perspective. It is for this reason that, for a 35 mm camera, lenses with focal lengths from about 85 through 135 mm are generally considered to be good portrait lenses. It does however make difference, whether the photograph is taken landscape or portrait. A 50 mm lens is suitable for photographing people when the orientation is landscape. Conversely, using lenses with much longer focal lengths for portraits results in more extreme flattening of facial features, which also may be objectionable to the viewer.

=== Photograph viewing distance ===
Photographs are ordinarily viewed at a distance approximately equal to their diagonal. When viewed at this distance, the distortion effects created by the angle of view of the capture are apparent. However, theoretically, if one views pictures exhibiting extension (wide angle) distortion at a closer distance, thus widening the angle of view of the presentation, then the phenomenon abates. Similarly, viewing pictures exhibiting compression (telephoto) distortion from a greater distance, thus narrowing the angle of view of the presentation, reduces the effect. In both cases, at some critical distance, the apparent distortion disappears completely.

=== Examples ===
Below, a series of three photos shows the same scene shot from the same position with three different lenses: a wide-angle lens, a normal lens, and a telephoto lens. Notice that because the proportions in the image do not change with the angle of view, if the photos made with the wide-angle lens and the normal lens were cropped to contain the same scene as the photo made with the telephoto lens, then the image content would be exactly the same. The apparent difference in proportions results solely from the content added around the edges of the frame in the normal lens photo and the wide-angle photo.

Photos taken using a 35 mm still camera at a constant distance from the subject with a 28 mm lens, a 50 mm lens and a 70 mm lens.

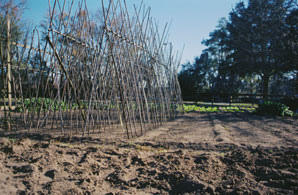
28 mm

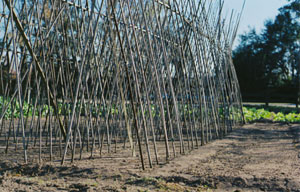
50 mm

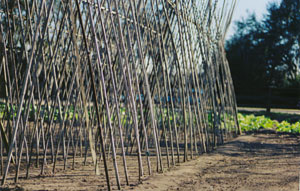
70 mm

Below, a series of four photos shows an object framed as nearly the same as possible with four different lenses. As a result of the different angle of view of each lens, the photographer moved closer to the object with each photo. Note that the angle of view changes significantly (compare the background in each photo), and the distance between objects appears greater with each succeeding image. In the fourth image at the lower right, taken with the widest lens, the building behind the object appears much further away than in reality.

Photos taken using a 35 mm camera with a 100 mm, a 70 mm, a 50 mm, and a 28 mm lens, at different distances from the subject.

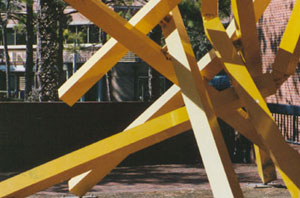
100mm

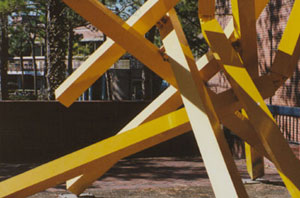
70 mm

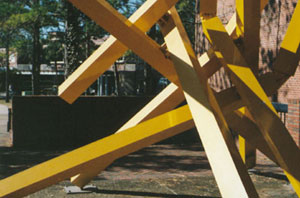
50 mm

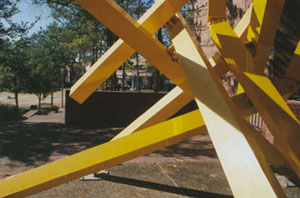
28 mm

== Artistic uses ==
=== Technical background ===
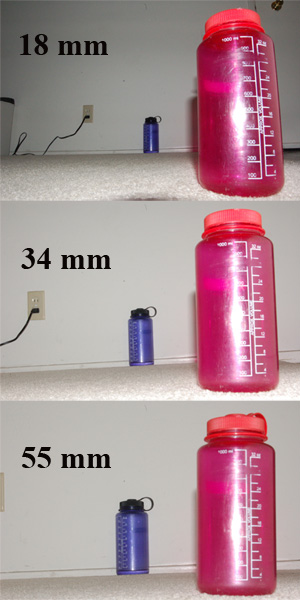
How focal length affects perspective: 18 mm (wide-angle), 34 mm (normal), and 55 mm (modest telephoto) at identical field size achieved by different camera-subject distances. Notice that the shorter the focal length and the wider the angle of view, perspective distortion and size differences change.

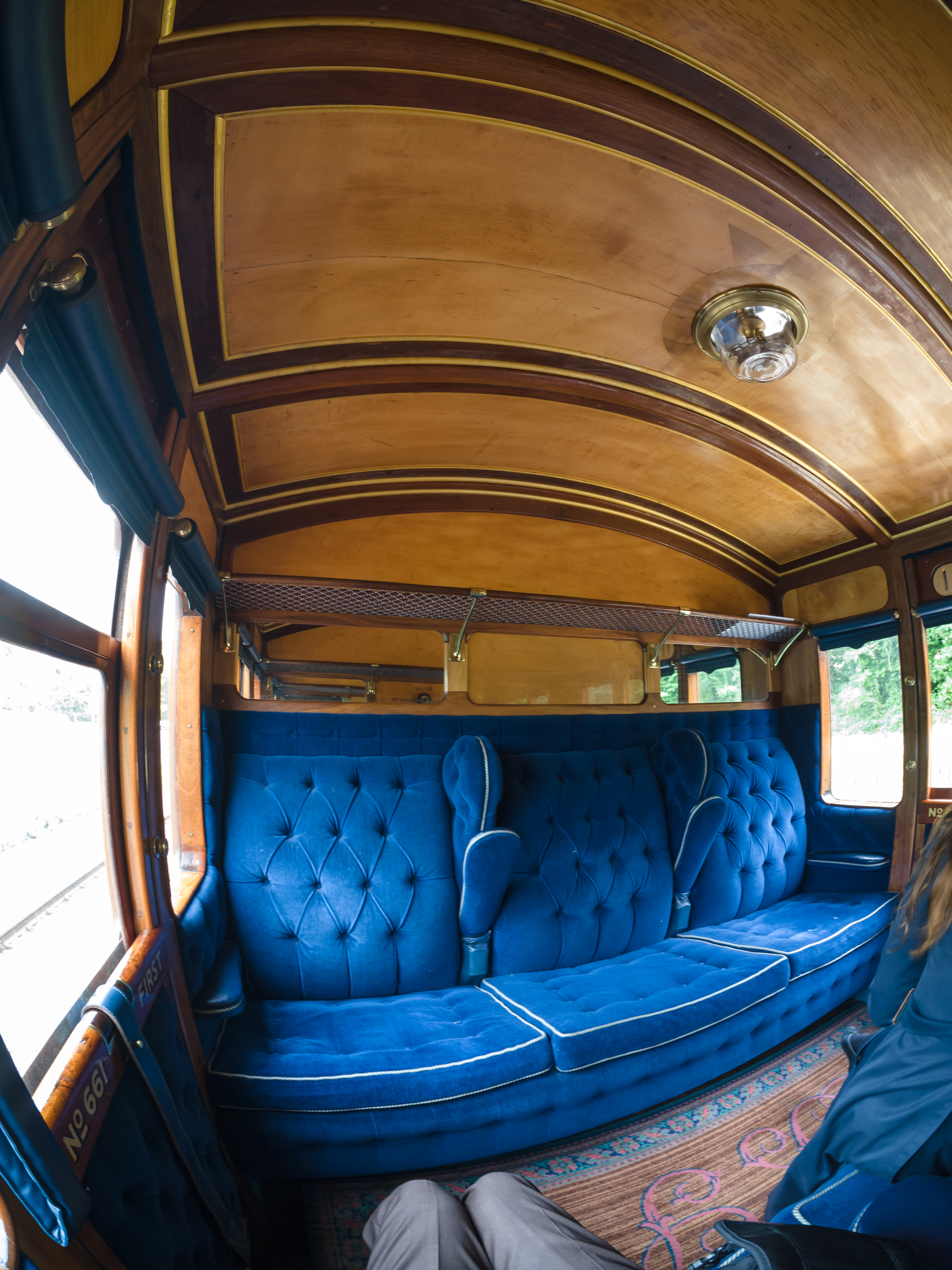
Bluebell railway

Although perspective distortion is often annoying when unintended, it is also intentionally used for artistic purposes. Extension (wide angle) distortion is often implemented to emphasize some element of the scene by making it appear larger and spatially removed from the other elements. Compression (telephoto) distortion is often used to give the appearance of compressed distance between distant objects, such as buildings or automobiles in order to convey a feeling of congestion. Longer lenses magnify the subject more, apparently compressing distance and (when focused on the foreground) blurring the background because of their shallower depth of field. Wider lenses tend to magnify distance between objects while allowing greater depth of field.

Another result of using a wide-angle lens is a greater apparent perspective distortion when the camera is not aligned perpendicularly to the subject: parallel lines converge at the same rate as with a normal lens, but converge more due to the wider total field. For example, buildings appear to be falling backwards much more severely when the camera is pointed upward from ground level than they would if photographed with a normal lens at the same distance from the subject, because more of the subject building is visible in the wide-angle shot.

Because different lenses generally require a different camera–subject distance to preserve the size of a subject, changing the angle of view can indirectly distort perspective, changing the apparent relative size of the subject and background. If identical field size is maintained, wide-angle lenses make subjects appear larger by introducing size differences along with the converging lines mentioned above, and they make rooms and spaces around the subject appear more vast by increasing the distance between subject and background (expanded perspective).

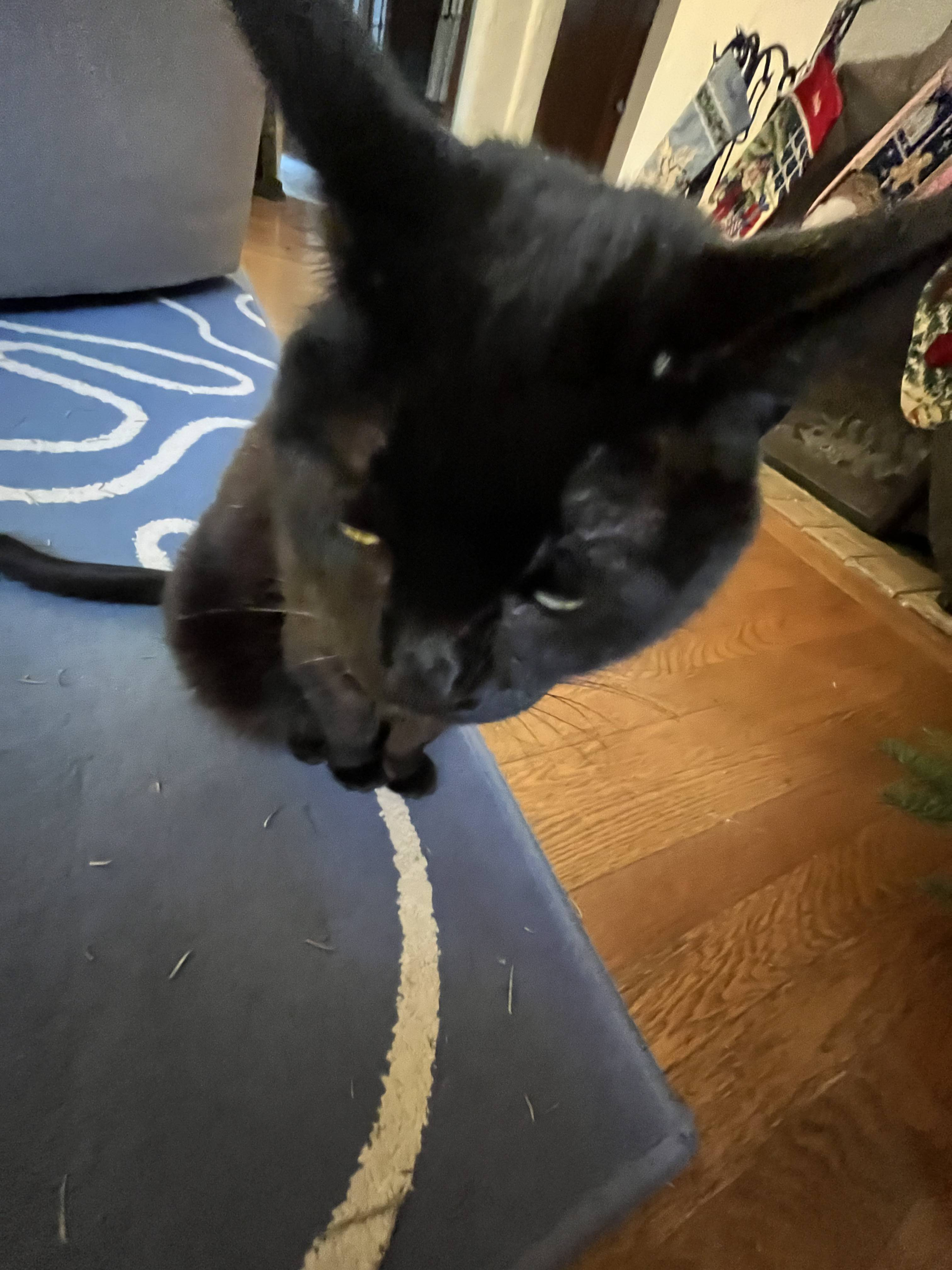
Cat pictured from very close

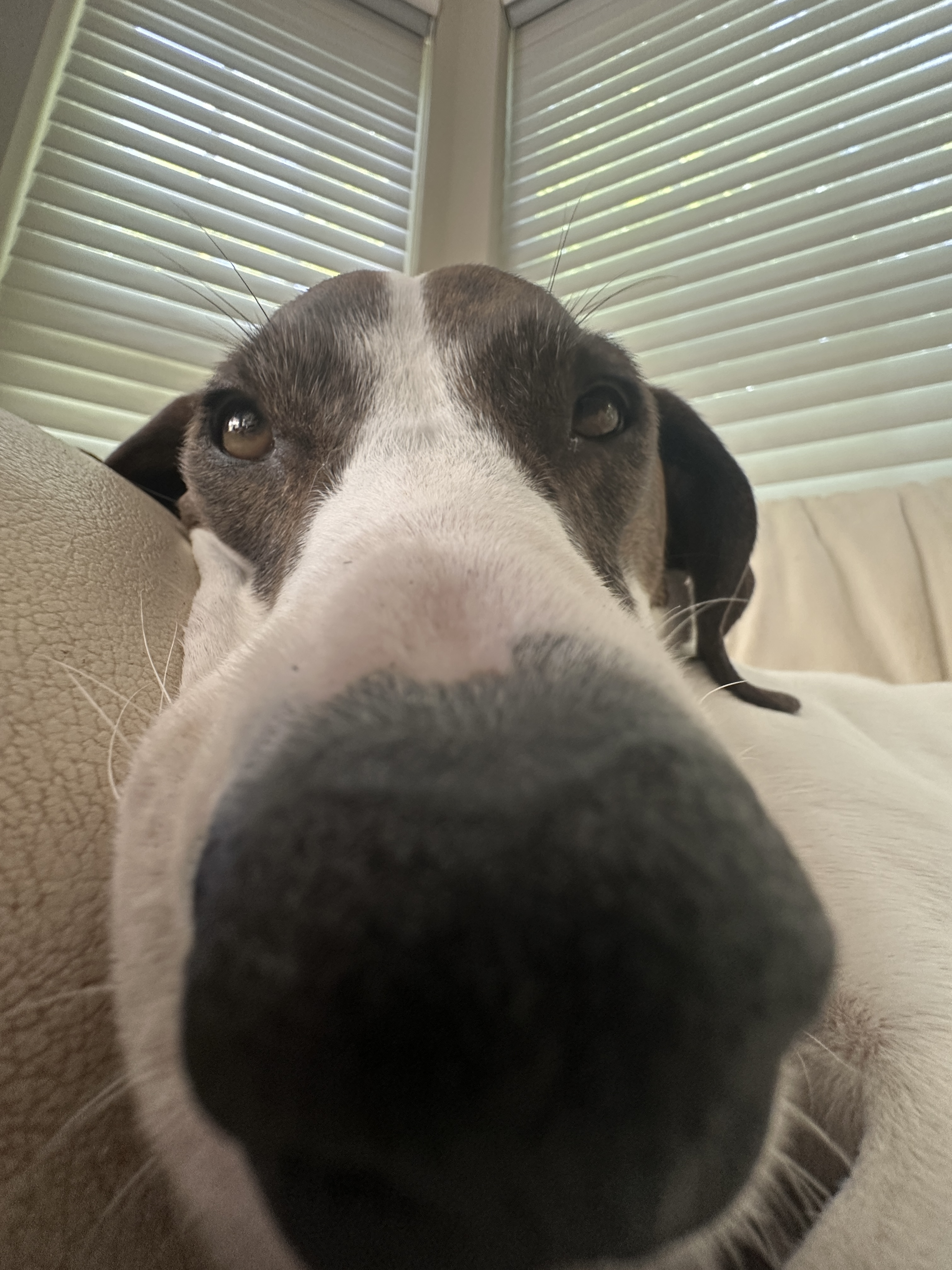
Dog pictured from very close with a 0.5x lens

=== Mood effect and famous uses ===
The mood effect of perspective distortion achieved by rectilinear extreme wide-angle lenses is that the resulting image looks grotesque and unsettling, while not looking as unrealistic as curvilinear fisheye lenses which display barrel distortion. The effect is especially noticeable the closer the camera is to the subject, as its amount increases the shorter the focal length is at the same field size.

One notable director that frequently employs rectilinear ultra wide angle lenses in order to achieve a distinctive signature style defined by extreme perspective distortion is Terry Gilliam. Also Stanley Kubrick (in Paths of Glory, and Dr. Strangelove, among others) as well as Orson Welles (in The Trial, partly Orson Welles' London, segment Four Clubmen), Sam Peckinpah (in Straw Dogs), and Sidney Lumet (in The Offence) have occasionally done the same in the past, though mostly in moderation, for single shots or sequences only, while Gilliam hardly ever uses any lens longer than 14 mm, which has garnered lenses of that particular focal length the informal nickname "The Gilliam" among film-makers. Jean-Pierre Jeunet and Marc Caro, two French filmmakers influenced by Gilliam, adopted his typical wide-angle photography in their two most "Gilliamesque" features, Delicatessen and The City of Lost Children. Orson Welles's The Trial is notable for heavily influencing Gilliam's signature style years before the American ex-patriate joined the Monty Python comedy troupe while only being a one-feature style for Welles.

Due to the grotesque, unsettling mood effect peculiar to wide-angle lenses, films making use of such perspective distortion can often be placed in one of two categories: Grotesque and surreal satire and fantasy, also to some extent black comedy (Gilliam, Jeunet & Caro, Orson Welles, Dr. Strangelove) on the one hand, and serious, more realistic films with a particular edge for social criticism on the other, whereas social conventions, collective society, and/or the motives and acts of leaders are portrayed as grotesque and absurd, and often also feature tyrannical characters with conformist values who act out in an extremely hostile and prejudiced way towards individualism and outsiders (Paths of Glory, Straw Dogs, The Offence).

On the other end of the focal length spectre, Leni Riefenstahl used extreme telephoto lenses to compress large crowds in Triumph of the Will while the Führer Adolf Hitler is seen through normal lenses and often from a low angle to appear tall in comparison.

In cinematography, perspective distortion also has bearing on the in-camera special effect known as the dolly zoom, in which a zoom lens zooms out at the same time as the camera moves toward the subject, in such a way as to keep the subject the same size in the frame while the background "changes size" relative to the subject. This effect was made popular in the films Vertigo and Jaws. Another example of this can be seen in the first Lord of the Rings film, just before the Black Rider comes down the road. The dolly zoom is used to create a compression effect in the road.

=== Examples ===
The photo below of the gondolas is an illustration of the use of extension distortion, and the photo of the buildings below it is an example of compression distortion.

An example of "wide angle" distortion used for artistic purposes. Created by an 18 mm lens on a full-frame 35 mm camera.

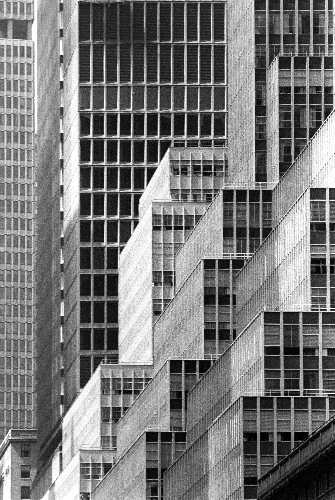
An example of "telephoto" distortion used for artistic purposes. Created by a 300 mm lens on a full-frame 35 mm camera.

== See also ==
- Foreshortening
- Perspective Control (PC) Lens
- Texture gradient
- Curvilinear perspective
- Telephoto compression
