= Film look =

Video editing technique

Film look (also known as filmizing or film-look) is a process in which video is altered in overall appearance to appear to have been shot on film stock. The process is usually electronic, although filmizing can sometimes occur as an unintentional by-product of some optical techniques, such as telerecording. The process has the opposite result to VidFIRE, used to restore a video look to telerecorded video.

== Differences between video and film ==
- Frame rate: 24 frames per second for film, 25 or 30 frames per second for old SD video. Modern video cameras shoot 24 and up as well.
- Shutter angle: Shorter (90° to 210°) for film, often ~350° for old video. Modern video cameras have adjustable electronic, or – in Arri's video cameras – mechanical shutters.
- Dynamic range: film and video systems have widely varying limits to the luminance dynamic ranges that they can capture. Modern video cameras are much closer to the dynamic range of film, and their use is better understood by directors.
- Field of view and depth of field: Depth of field is tangentially related to the size of the image plane, however, it is a popular misconception that the image plane is directly related to DOF. Smaller image planes (whether film or sensor) require a proportionally smaller lens to achieve a similar field of view. This means that a frame with a 12 degree horizontal field of view will require a 50 mm lens on 16 mm film, a 100 mm lens on 35 mm film, and a 250 mm lens on 65 mm film. And a 250 mm lens delivers much shallower DOF than a 50 mm lens does. It follows that standard lenses on most consumer video cameras with small sensors provide much larger depth of field than 35 mm film. Digital cinema cameras like the Red One or Panavision Genesis, as well as some digital SLR cameras with video capabilities, (such as the Canon EOS 5D Mark II), have sensors roughly equal in size to 35 mm film frames and thus show the same field of view characteristics.
- Photo-chemical color-timing/grading: only possible with film; white balance adjustment for video performs a similar function.
- Noise type: film grain noise generally differs both statistically and visually from digital sensor noise. However, artificial noise can be added to video, to simulate film grain.
- Jump & Weave: Images projected from film do not always align properly from frame to frame when projected on screen due to minor variations in sprocket hole size.

=== Frame rate ===
Today, most digital cinematography video cameras in use feature 24p format (24 progressive frames per second).

When shooting with old cameras, 50 Hz interlaced video (usually used with most forms of PAL and SECAM) can be relatively easily processed to give 25 progressive frames per second, which is the framerate that the PAL/SECAM telecine process also uses. Every two video fields can be "blended" together, every other field can be decimated and the remaining fields can be shown for double the length (this noticeably reduces vertical resolution), or a motion estimation process can be applied to achieve one frame out of every two fields. This technique is sometimes called Field-removed video or FRV. Some modern PAL video cameras do offer the ability to produce 25 frame-per-second progressive video, negating the requirement of post-processing the video to get a temporal similarity to film.

On the other hand, it is much more complicated to convert 60 Hz interlaced video (used with NTSC and PAL-M) to a framerate resembling that of film. Doing the same as PAL/SECAM filmizing will yield 30 frame-per-second video, which is significantly faster than film. Two out of every five fields could be dropped (and 3:2 Pulldown can be applied to the remaining fields), but any motion after this process will look very uneven. Sophisticated computer motion estimation and field blending is usually used to convert NTSC video to 24 frames-per-second – something which could not have been done until recently, and still does not yield as realistic results as PAL filmizing conversion.

Many computer editing programs can de-interlace video to give it more of a film look. An interlaced frame is actually the combination of two fields, one providing the odd-numbered scan lines and the other the even-numbered. Interlacing results in a type of motion blur known as "combing", and also shows "interline twitter" where vertical details approach the resolution limit, neither of which occur in film. De-interlacing can remove or reduce these artifacts, resulting in an appearance closer to that of film.

Some inexpensive consumer editing programs achieve de-interlacing by deleting one of the fields. The result gives half the vertical resolution of the original frame, and sometimes adds a jagged effect to the picture.

=== Shutter angle ===
For each frame, video cameras normally expose their sensor as long as they can, while film cameras only expose the negative up to half this time, so that they can transport the negative in the remaining time. Many video cameras now allow adjusting the shutter timing manually, though, so this is no longer a big concern.

=== Dynamic range ===
Old video technology only had a 5-stop exposure dynamic range. Modern HD video cameras have up to 14 stops. The exposure range is therefore less of an issue than before, although there is still a popular belief that video is considerably worse than film in the shoulder of the gamma curve, where whites blow out in video, while film tends to overexpose more evenly and gracefully.

=== Grading ===
The footage may also be graded to have more of a "filmic look." In the US, this process is often referred to as color timing.

=== Jump and weave ===
In a standard film projector, each frame of film is positioned, or registered by being held motionless against a rectangular opening, known as the gate, for a fraction of a second. While in the gate, light passes through the image in the frame, to be projected onto the screen. As soon as the shutter cuts off the light, either sprockets or a device called a claw is used to move the film rapidly so that the next frame can be registered in the gate before the shutter opens again. However, the pins on the sprockets (or the claw) do not fit the sprocket holes in the film perfectly. There must be some slight clearance to allow the pins to enter and leave the sprocket holes without undue friction or binding. This discrepancy means that each frame cannot be positioned perfectly within the gate each time; the frame may be slightly too high or low (jump) or to the left or right (weave). This introduces unintended motion from frame to frame as the film is projected. This discrepancy can increase as the film becomes worn with use, causing the sprocket holes to become more and more enlarged, thus allowing more error in frame position.

When film is scanned so that an electronic (video) copy can be made, various means are used to help ensure that the variations in frame position as a result of sprocket hole wear are minimized. The more effective these means are, the less of a 'film look' the result will have. On the contrary, if this compensation is reduced or disabled, the resulting electronic copy may exhibit more jump and weave, giving the result a sense of constant jitter.

== Filmized productions ==
US productions most often use actual film for prime time dramas and situation comedy series and filmizing is more common outside North America. Video production is cheaper than film.

Television series, specials, soap operas, sitcoms and films that have been filmized include:

- A.N.T. Farm (high-definition video)
- All My Children (2006–2009)
- Alys (high-definition video)
- Bad Girls
- Brookside
- Choo Choo Soul
- Coast
- Derry Girls
- Doctor Who (2005 onwards)
- Drake & Josh (season 1 used FilmLook processing)
- Family Affairs
- Footballers' Wives
- Good Luck Charlie (high-definition video)
- Grange Hill
- Hall of Mirrors (2001 film)
- Hannah Montana (only Season 4)
- Heartbeat
- Holby City
- Hollyoaks
- Home and Away (high-definition video, since 2003)
- Hot in Cleveland (high-definition video)
- iCarly (high-definition video)
- Last of the Summer Wine
- MTV Video Music Awards (2002, 2003 and 2006 editions)
- Neighbours (high-definition video, since 2007)
- Night and Day (high-definition video since recent seasons.)
- Outnumbered
- Reba
- Red Dwarf Remastered
- Red Dwarf VII
- Salute Your Shorts
- Sam & Cat
- Sonny with a Chance (high-definition video)
- Spaced
- Survivor (beginning with Gabon)
- The League of Gentlemen
- The Mighty Boosh (Series 1)
- The Office (high-definition video)
- The Suite Life on Deck (season 1 episodes used FilmLook processing)
- The Young and the Restless (used on the April 2, 2008 episode)
- Trollied
- True Jackson, VP
- Tyler Perry's House of Payne (high-definition video)
- Undressed
- Victorious (high-definition video)
- WWE SmackDown (June 12, 2009 edition. Used since September 26, 2019–present.)

Many digitally-shot television and film productions have been filmized during mastering.

== Limitations ==
Footage that has been shot with the knowledge that it will be subsequently electronically filmized is usually shot in a very different way, with film-style lighting and framing. Regardless, there have been several attempts to process ordinary videotape to look like film, usually with little success. Notable examples include Red Dwarf Remastered – digitally remastered versions of the first three series of Red Dwarf. As well as being filmized, the episodes had been cropped to widescreen and had all their visual effects remade.

BBC hospital drama-soap Casualty also flirted briefly with the filmizing process in the mid-1990s, but it was quickly dropped after viewer complaints that the show "looked wrong." The same happened with Emmerdale where it was used for 7 episodes in October 2002 before being quietly dropped.

The fantasy series Neverwhere was a video-based production which suffered as a result of having been shot and lit with filmization in mind. The decision to filmize was later reversed, resulting in a negative response to the film-style lighting which came across poorly on the unprocessed video footage.

Filmizing success stories include The League of Gentlemen, Spaced, The Office and Heartbeat, all of which can fool most people into believing they were shot on film. On 25 November 2007 an episode of Heartbeat was broadcast without filmizing and the show's producers later admitted this was a post-production error. This error caused alarm amongst the show's fans amidst fears that a permanent switch to video was being made indicating the success of the filmizing technique on this production.

The Fox show Arrested Development used an elaborate post-production process to adjust colors and brightness levels to match those of film stock.

The 1970s BBC TV show Porridge provides a stark example of the visual differences between film and videotape. The show employed videotape for scenes inside Fletcher's cell, whereas film was used for scenes outside the cell. The difference in lighting style and frame rate is very noticeable. Many British television series from the 1960s through the 1980s used videotape for interior scenes and film for exterior shots due to equipment limitations. This was parodied in the 'Society for Putting Things on top of Other Things' sketch in Monty Python's Flying Circus (Series 2, Episode 5).

== See also ==
- Depth-of-field adapter
- Digital cinema
- Digital cinematography
- Digital intermediate
- 24p
- Progressive scan
- FilmLook
- Film emulation
- Filmmaking
- Independent film
