= Dxo =

DXO may refer to:

- Dextrorphan, a psychoactive drug and metabolite of the cough suppressant dextromethorphan
- DxO Labs, a French photography software company
- Decapping exoribonuclease, an enzyme encoded by the gene DXO
