= Nik Collection =

Suite of photo editing plugins

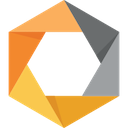
- Developer: DxO Labs
- Initial release: 2013; 13 years ago
- Stable release: 8.1 / July 8, 2025; 6 months ago
- Operating system: macOS, Windows
- Predecessor: Nik Software Complete Collection Ultimate Edition, Google Nik Collection 1.0
- Available in: 5 languages
- List of languages English, French, German, Simplified Chinese, Japanese
- Type: Image editing, Photo manipulation
- License: Proprietary (non-subscription)
- Website: nikcollection.dxo.com

The Nik Collection is a suite of photo editing plugins intended for use with a host application, such as Adobe Lightroom, Affinity Photo or DxO PhotoLab.

== History ==
Nik Sharpener and Nik Color Efex were developed by Nik Multimedia Inc. in the 1990s as digital photo filters that could be used in Photoshop or as standalone applications. Some years later, in 2003, Dfine 1.0, a denoising application and plugin was added to the list of products on offer.

The newly rebranded Nik Software company then added Viveza and Silver Efex to the offer in 2008, and subsequently bundled all of their award-winning photo editing plugin applications, Dfine 2.0, Viveza, Color Efex Pro 3.0, Silver Efex Pro and Sharpener Pro 3.0 together in a single Collection. The Complete Collection Ultimate Edition sold for $599.95 USD and the Complete Collection for Lightroom and Aperture for $299.95 USD. HDR EFex was added to the collection in 2010.

After acquisition, Google relaunched the collection of six applications, with the new Analog Efex, in 2013 as the Google Nik Collection and reduced its price to $150 and then, in 2016, made it completely free to use.

In 2017 Google sold the, now seven-application, collection to DxO Labs for an undisclosed amount. DxO Labs have since added an eighth application: Perspective Efex.

In 2023 it was announced that version 6.3 marked the first release of the software built entirely using DxO's own code.

== U Points ==
U Point technology was originally developed by Nik Software in the early 2000s as a way to make selective adjustments. They realized that making selections in Photoshop was very difficult and time consuming, the tools were often very difficult to learn and even harder to master. The name U Point comes from the idea that 'you', the photographer, simply point at what to adjust in the photo. U-Point algorithms enable selections based on each pixel’s attributes, such as hue, saturation, brightness, and contrast. So, users do not create traditional masks in Nik Collection; instead, using Control Points or Control Lines, they construct sophisticated selections based on pixel attributes.

== Version History ==
=== Version 1.0 ===
Although all of the apps in the initial collection were developed by Nik Software over a number of years it was Google who launched the first Nik Collection product in 2013. It comprised Color Efex Pro 4, HDR Efex Pro 2, Silver Efex Pro 2, Dfine 2, Viveza 2, and Sharpener Pro 3.

=== Version 2.0 ===
On 4 June 2019, almost 2 years after its acquisition by DxO Labs a second version was released that worked in standalone mode, no longer requiring a host program to function.

=== Version 3.0 ===
In June 2020, version 3 was released with an eighth plug-in called Perspective Efex. Very similar to DxO ViewPoint, and often offering features common to the host program, it can correct anamorphosis and other geometric issues as well as offer a "miniature" effect. Nik Collection 3 won the category for Best Photo Software at the EISA awards some months after its release.

=== Version 4.0 ===
Version 4 came out in August 2021 with a new UI for Viveza and Silver Efex. The 'U Point' selection engine features precision color selection using chrominance and luminance sliders for adjustment by hue, saturation or brightness. Other new features include a pack of 25 presets and 6 meta presets for use across the suite, as well as DxO's dehazing algorithm, ClearView, and film grain emulations both for Color Efex and Silver Efex.

=== Version 5.0 ===
Launched in June 2022, featuring a new UI for Color Efex and Analog Efex, a floating selection palette for Lightroom and Photoshop, ClearView dehazing and grain effects for Color Efex, and U Point preset, luminance, and chrominance controls for Analog and Color Efex.

=== Version 6.3 ===
Version 6.0, launched on the 16 May 2023, notable for the introduction of U Point Control Lines, was followed four months later by 6.3, the first release to be entirely authored by DxO since they acquired the code from Google, with the same UI applied to all plugins. Compatible with Apple Silicon, this version handles HiDPI monitors and multiscreening as well as automatically detecting Affinity Photo during installation.

=== Version 7.0 ===
Released on the 6 May 2024, the first major release entirely coded by DxO, features only seven plugins following the removal of Perspective Efex. However, new features in Nik Color Efex include HSL filtering, dynamic filters, and access to Viveza as a filter. Upgraded selection tools include polygon and elliptical U Points as well as a new luminosity masking option. Direct plugin-to-plugin switching and the ability export directly from each plugin complete the workflow improvements.

== Awards ==
- Nik Software Complete Collection won the TIPA Award for Best Photo Software in 2011
- Version 3 of the software won the EISA 2020 Award for Best Photo Editing Software
