= DxO ViewPoint =

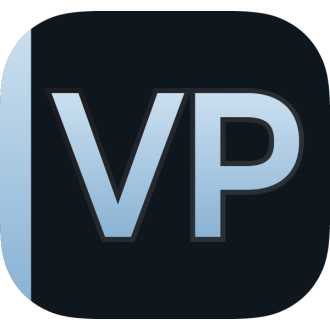
- Developer(s): DxO Labs
- Initial release: September 5, 2012; 12 years ago
- Operating system: Windows, macOS
- Type: Digital Image Correction and Enhancement
- License: Proprietary
- Website: www.dxo.com/dxo-viewpoint/

DxO ViewPoint is image geometry and lens defect correction software developed by DxO. It is designed to automatically straighten distorted perspectives caused by the lens used and the position of the photographer. The software claims to be able to make precise corrections to lens flaws through its use of DxO's database of calibrations (called DxO Optics Modules) which have been created through laboratory tests.

DxO ViewPoint exists for macOS and Windows computers. It functions as an independent application, as a plugin for DxO PhotoLab, and as an external editor for Adobe Photoshop, Adobe Lightroom, and Adobe Photoshop Elements.

== Functionality ==
DxO ViewPoint allows users to correct the horizon, keystoning, volume distortion (volume anamorphosis), and a number of lens distortions automatically or through sliders. Lens distortions include barrel, pincushion, and fisheye. DxO ViewPoint's corrections are based on DxO's data created through a large volume of images produced using different lens and camera combinations in DxO's laboratory.

DxO ViewPoint's volume distortion correction can be used to attempt to recover the natural proportions of objects that have been distorted due to their proximity to the edge of the frame when photographed with a wide-angle lens. DxO claims that this can be useful when editing photographs of groups of people where individuals nearest the edge of the frame can seem wider than those at the center.

Users can correct keystoning in order to adjust the perspective of a photograph, either automatically or through manual methods including point selection, placing horizontal and vertical lines, or creating a rectangle.

Users can set DxO ViewPoint to automatically crop an image once an adjustment has been made.

DxO ViewPoint can also be used to produce creative effects such as generating an extremely shallow depth of field and simulating the use of a tilt-shift lens.

== Development ==
=== Version 1 ===
DxO ViewPoint was released on September 5, 2012, and featured tools to allow users to correct keystoning and volume distortions. It was launched as a standalone application for MacOS and Windows, and also as a plugin for Adobe Photoshop CS3, CS4, CS5, CS6, and Adobe Photoshop Lightroom 3 and 4.

=== Version 2 ===
Released on 25 September 2013 and introduced access to DxO Optics Modules allowing users to automatically correct geometric distortions such as barrel or pincushion distortions. Other updates included:

- a new tool to allow users to place eight points in order to correct converging lines;
- a “Natural” setting shortcut to let users adjust the intensity of their corrections;
- the option to maximize the image field for further editing;
- compatibility with Adobe Photoshop Elements and Apple Aperture.

=== Version 3 ===
Launched on November 17, 2016, introduced automatic perspective and horizon correction tools, and a tool to create a shallow depth of field through graduated blurring to simulate the use of a tilt-shift lens. Further automation was introduced to allow users to correct geometric distortion, straighten horizontal and vertical lines, correct horizons, remove keystoning, and crop images.

=== Version 4 ===
Launched in 2022, adds ReShape tool for manually aligning specific parts of an image, flipping and rotating tools, and guides to help with alignment.

== Reception ==
PCMag described DxO ViewPoint 2 as “essential for photographers of groups of people, where you need to use a wide-angle lens but your customers won't be happy with folks on the sides having stretched physiognomies”. PCMag gave it four out of five stars and awarded it Editor's Choice.

Northlight Images described DxO ViewPoint 3 as “A sound update to an already very useful piece of software”.

DxO ViewPoint 2 was awarded Best Imaging Software by the TIPA Awards in 2014.
