= FGO =

FGO may refer to:

- Fate/Grand Order, an online free-to-play role-playing game
- Florida Grand Opera, an American opera company
- Film grain overlay, a process in which film emulsion characteristics are overlaid using different levels of opacity onto a digital file
