= Depth-of-field adapter =

A depth-of-field adapter (often shortened to DOF adapter) is used to achieve shallow depth of field on a video camera whose fixed lens or interchangeable lens selection is limited or economically prohibitive at providing such an effect. A DOF adapter could theoretically be used on a multitude of platforms, although it is most useful on prosumer digital camcorders where high resolution is a capability but the sensor size is still small enough to elicit use of the adapter. The term 35mm adapter is common, since most designs use a focusing screen the size of a 35mm film frame (24×36 mm) and interface with lenses designed for 35mm cameras. The use of adapters has decreased largely due to the video function available on newer DSLR cameras. DOF adapters have been developed for use with smartphones, allowing DSLR lenses to be used with phone cameras.

== How it works ==
A DOF adapter focuses an image onto a translucent screen (similar to how one would look at a focused image through a system camera's viewfinder) located between an external lens and the camera's main lens. The camcorder can frame this intermediate screen by focusing in macro mode. The principle is similar to pointing a video camera at a movie screen. The lens attached to the adapter now takes the job of the camcorder's focusing and aperture mechanisms. The camcorder's only responsibility at this point is to record what is being projected onto the focusing screen (called "back focus").

== Limitations ==
A DOF adapter comes with a few limitations. First is the inherent light loss that comes with attaching the unit to the front of the camera. Using any one of these adapters requires that the scene being shot by the camera be adequately lit.

Static (non-moving) adapters suffer greater image degradation from low-light situations because the texture on the focusing screen becomes more noticeable. The camcorder used in conjunction with the adapter must focus on the focusing screen inside the adapter which is used as a projection surface. As a result, the camcorder also picks up the pits, dimples and/or specks in the material that give it its translucent properties. The solution to this problem is to shake, rotate or otherwise move the focusing screen so that the texture of the screen is blurred. In a non-static solution such as this, the texture is only a problem at very high shutter speeds, where blurring is reduced.

Vignetting, barrel distortion and chromatic aberration are also problems that are difficult to eradicate. The optics within the adapter must be of high quality and at the correct distance from each other to minimize these issues.

Image orientation is also an issue. The adapter, like any other lens, flips the image upside-down. To help address this issue while filming, an external monitor such as a small LCD screen may be mounted upside down to view the image in its correct orientation. Some LCD screens feature both mirror and flip options that correctly orient the image (flip vertically and mirror horizontally). In either case, the actual recorded footage must still be rotated 180 degrees in post-production. The one exception to this is the option to mount the camera upside down. This will allow the camera to record an upright image. However the camera LCD will still flip the image, and an external LCD monitor is still required.

Another option is to use a flip module. A flip module is yet another addition to the 35mm adapter construction set that is made up of a series of mirrors or prisms that literally "flip" the image while shooting. This avoids the burden of needing an external LCD monitor, but at the cost of additional light loss. Many adapters already have a flip module within them, so the filmmakers do not have to worry about flipping the image in post-production.

== Construction ==
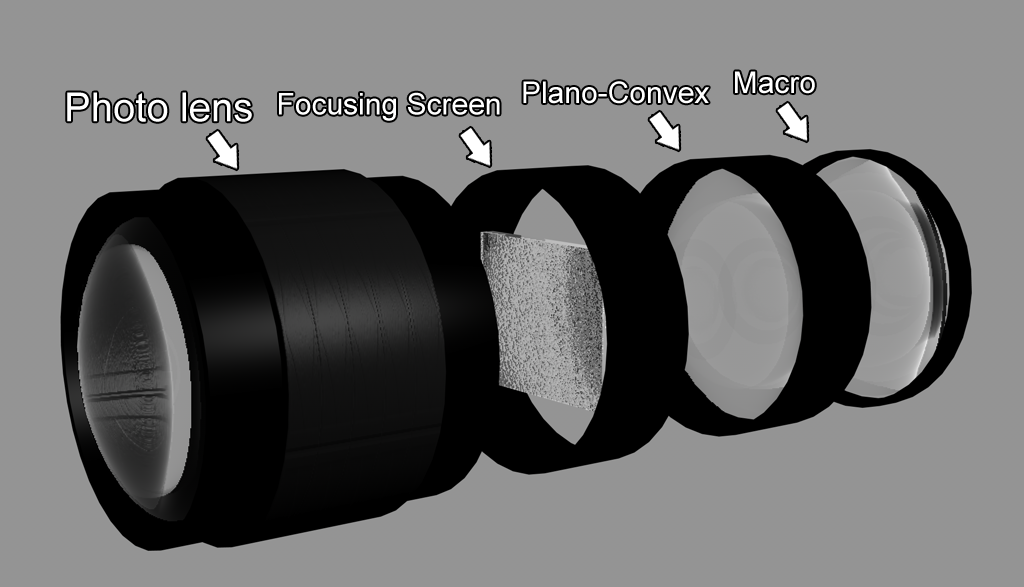
Example construction of a DOF adapter using a static ground glass focusing screen

A basic DOF adapter usually has four components: a macro lens, an optional plano-convex lens, a translucent focusing screen, and finally a photographic lens of the user's choice. On camcorders without sufficient macro capability, a macro lens, preferably an achromatic doublet (to minimize chromatic aberration), is usually attached directly to the camcorder so that the camcorder can zoom in and focus on the focusing screen. Without the macro lens, certain camcorders would be unable to zoom in well enough to frame the entire focusing screen and still achieve sharp focus. The optional plano-convex lens is used to avoid vignetting in the image. The focusing screen is where the photographic lens image is projected. The screen must be placed at precisely the correct distance from the flange focal mount of whatever lens is being used (most popularly the Canon FD or Nikon F mount), referred to as the flange back distance. Finally, the front lens is a photographic or cinema lens that projects the image desired onto the focusing screen.

== Price ==
The price of a DOF adapter ranges from tens of thousands of US dollars for a professional solution to less than a hundred by using parts available from a local hardware store. The pricing of a DOF adapter unit also depends on the material and technologies used. For instance, a relay lens system must be added if the adapter is to be directly mounted to a camera's body (bypassing the standard lens, as if on a Canon XL1 or XL2 and the Sony EX3). Also, a prism system that is used on some adapters that correctly reorients the image rightside-up adds to the cost.

== See also ==
- Filmizing
