= Filmlook, Inc. =

American post-production company

- Industry: Film
- Founded: 1987; 39 years ago in Burbank, United States
- Area served: Worldwide
- Products: Movies

Filmlook, Inc. is a post-production company based in Burbank, California. Established in 1989, it specializes in a form of image processing used on television programs, commonly known as film look. The company was awarded an Engineering Plaque at the Primetime Emmy Engineering Awards in 1992 for its Filmlook Process for Film Simulation.

== History ==
In 1987, company founder Robert Faber began developing the company's signature process. The company was founded in 1989.

== Filmlook process ==
The Filmlook process uses three main features to achieve the appearance of film: motion characteristics, gray scale/contrast, and grain pattern.

- Motion characteristics – With some video cameras, you see 60 interlaced pictures per second versus 24 in film. The Filmlook process attempts to replicate the feel of film. Newer digital cameras can shoot at a progressive 24 frames per second.
- Greyscale/contrast – Filmlook alters the gray scale, color, and contrast to approximate the typical film characteristic – the "film density curve".
- Simulation of grain pattern – A generated grain pattern that can be varied in intensity and attempts to imitate film grain by remaining static for the duration of each (imaginary) film frame (two or three fields).

== See also ==
- Filmizing
- 24p
