= Snapseed =

Photo editing app by Google

- Snapseed 4 on Pixel 9 with Android 15
- Developer: Google LLC (previously developed by Nik Software)
- Release: June 2011; 15 years ago

Stable release(s) [±]
- Android: 4.1.12 (Build 1005261101) / October 23, 2026; 4 days ago
- iOS (Note: Including iPadOS): 4.1.7 / October 19, 2026; 8 days ago
- Operating system: iOS, Android
- Type: Image editing software
- License: Freeware

Snapseed is a photo-editing application for iOS and Android that enables users to enhance photos and apply digital filters. It was created by Nik Software, and is now owned by Google.

== History ==
Nik Software originally launched Snapseed on the iPad in June 2011, and it was named iPad App of the Year 2011 by Apple. Building on the success of the iPad version, Nik launched Snapseed for the iPhone in August 2011. Later, on February 27, 2012, Snapseed was announced for Microsoft Windows.

Subsequent to the Google take-over, Snapseed was released for Android in December 2012 and the desktop version of Snapseed was discontinued.

On April 9, 2015, Nik released Snapseed 2.0 for iOS and Android, bringing new tools, features, and a refreshed user interface.

In June 2025, Google released Snapseed 3.0 for iOS, introducing a redesigned user interface, new film-inspired filters, enhanced RAW editing tools, and improved integration with Google Photos. The update was only available for iOS at launch, with no confirmed timeline for Android support.

On May 7, 2026, Snapseed 4.0.0 was released for Android and iOS with a modernized interface as well as new features including batch editing, in-app camera, and one-touch masking. Store listings describe the "editing process [is] smoother and more intuitive." The logo was also changed by removing a rectangle that was behind the green leaf, the only remaining element.

== Features ==
Snapseed users can edit pictures using swiping gestures to select different effects and enhancements. Alternatively, users can opt for an "automatic" adjustment of color and contrast. Snapseed can save users' editing history and redirect to any of the actions before. It can also create and save filter combinations by using the default filters and editing features. The list of special effects and filters includes Drama, Grunge, Vintage, Center-focus, Frames, and a Tilt-shift (which resizes photos). Users can import RAW images as well for better quality edits. Snapseed 2.0 introduced new filters such as lens blur, glamour glow, HDR scape and noir, while also reformatting the tools section with a clearer user interface.

In June 2025, Snapseed 3.0 added a redesigned user interface, a new "Faves" tab for organizing preferred tools, 31 film-inspired filters, enhanced RAW editing tools with arc-based sliders, and tighter integration with Google Photos. The update also introduced a revamped home screen displaying recent edits and a streamlined toolbar layout.

In October 2025, Google announced the release of interactive on-device segmentation in Snapseed; the update introduced the "Object Brush," which was powered by Interactive Segmenter, an AI model. It allows users to edit objects by drawing a stroke on them and then changing how they look.

== Awards ==
- Named iPad App of the Year 2011 by Apple
- Named one of the Top 100 Best Android App of 2018 by PC Magazine
