= Capture NX =

Photo editing software

- Developer: Nik Software
- Release: February 21, 2006
- Website: imaging.nikon.com/lineup/software/capturenx/index.htm

Capture NX 2
- Developer: Nik Software
- Release: June 3, 2008
- Final release: 2.4.7 / October 1, 2014
- Website: imaging.nikon.com/lineup/software/capturenx2/

Capture NX-D
- Developer: Ichikawa Soft Laboratory Co. Ltd
- Release: July 15, 2014
- Final release: 1.6.5 / March 2, 2021
- Operating system: Windows 8 or later; OS X Yosemite or later
- Website: Archived July 14, 2020, at the Wayback Machine

Capture NX is an image editing application developed by Nik Software in partnership with Nikon for macOS and Microsoft Windows.

In September 2012, Google acquired Nik Software. Capture NX remained branded as a Nikon product.

In July 2014, Nikon released Capture NX-D to succeed Capture NX 2. As such, the Nikon D810 is the first camera to support only Capture NX-D. Capture NX-D was developed based on SILKYPIX Developer Studio and does not contain the U-Point technology from Nik Software.

On June 6, 2022, Nikon announced that Capture NX 2 and Capture NX-D would be discontinued and replaced by NX Studio. Download links for both programs were removed on June 30, 2022.

== Features of both Capture NX products ==
- Complete raw image format support from import to export (for supported cameras), including Nikon's own RAW format NEF (Nikon Electronic File).
- Non-destructive image editing.
- Color management control with Soft Proofing.
- Color Aberration Control, D-Lighting (High Speed/High Quality), Image Dust Off, Vignette Control and Fisheye-to-Rectilinear Image Transformation.
- Noise Reduction: global or selective adjustments.
- Color Balance, Contrast/Brightness, Saturation/Warmth.
- Lens correction tools, such as chromatic aberration or distortion control.
- Auto Retouch Brush, to remove blemishes and dust from images. (not in Capture NX-D V 1.0 but will be added later)
- Shadow/Highlight Adjustment, to open up shadows or recover blown out highlights.
- Improved Edit List, to apply common editings like auto color aberration, auto red-eye correction, vignette control, tone curves, contrast and highlight, exposure compensation and shadow protection.
- Filters, Ratings and Sorting Toolbar.

== Features of Capture NX-D only ==
- All changes are saved to a Sidecar File in subfolder NKS_PARAM.

== Features of Capture NX only ==
- All changes are saved to the NEF file.
- Color Control Point editing for hue, brightness and saturation.
- Selection Control Points, selectively edit photographs without the need to manually outline or mask the area for editing.
- Plug-In Interface for Nik Color Efex Pro
- Ability to use Dust Off Reference photo created by some Nikon DSLR's to automatically remove dust from images

== See also ==
- Adobe Photoshop Lightroom
- Aperture (software)
- iPhoto
