= DxO ONE =

Digital camera model

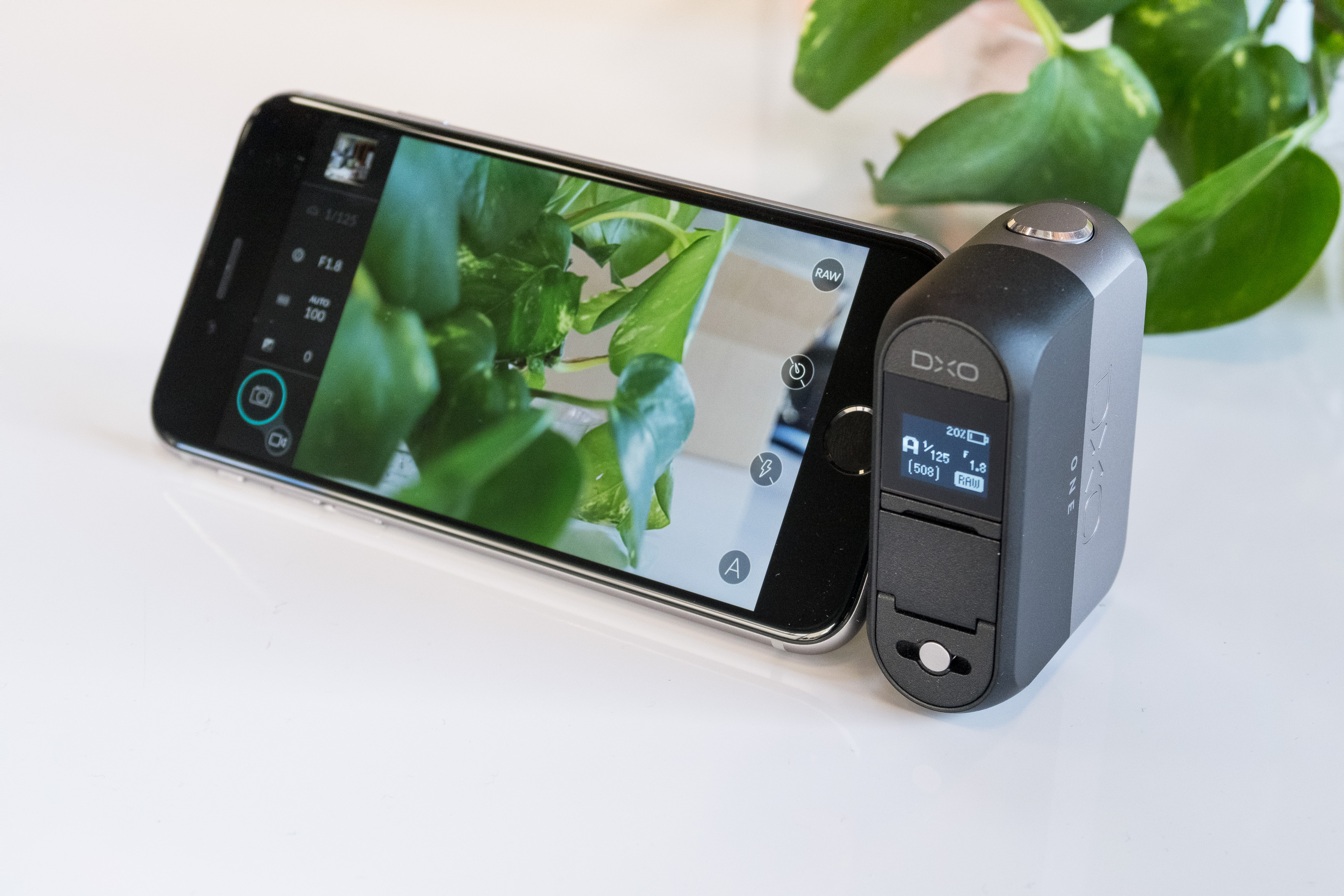
- DxO ONE in use with iPhone 6

Overview
- Maker: DxO Labs
- Type: Large sensor fixed-lens camera
- Intro price: USD 599 list price

Lens
- Lens: 11.9 mm (32 mm 35 mm equivalent)
- F-numbers: f/1.8 to f/11

Sensor/medium
- Sensor type: BSI-CMOS
- Sensor size: 13.2 x 8.8 mm (1-inch format)
- Maximum resolution: 5406 x 3604 (20.2 megapixels)
- Film speed: ISO 100 to 51200 (Hi 2)
- Recording medium: microSD
- Storage media: microSD

Focusing
- Focus: Contrast detect, using face-detection
- Focus modes: Auto, Face detect

Exposure/metering
- Metering modes: Auto, Program, Aperture, Shutter, Manual

Flash
- Flash: Uses mobile device flash

Shutter
- Shutter speeds: 1/8000 s to 15 s

Viewfinder
- Viewfinder: uses attached mobile device viewfinder

General
- Video recording: 1080p (30fps), 720p (120fps)
- Battery: internal, non-user replaceable
- Data port(s): microUSB for data, Lightning for camera connection
- Dimensions: 2.7×1.9×1.0 in (69×48×25 mm)
- Weight: 3.81 oz (108 g)

The DxO ONE from DxO Labs was a small camera that attached to an iPhone or iPad using the Lightning connector port. It was introduced in June 2015. The DxO ONE had a 1-inch format, 20.2 megapixel image sensor—the same one found in the Sony Cyber-shot DSC-RX100—and an f/1.8 maximum-aperture lens and high-speed shutter. The ONE used the attached mobile device as an electronic viewfinder for the camera, which did not have its own viewfinder.

It is similar to a lens-style camera, insofar as it was designed to be attached to a smartphone so that the phone's screen could be used as the camera's display. However, the DxO ONE is not shaped like a lens, and it is easier to use as a standalone camera because it has a low-resolution black-and-white screen that can display live view.

European Imaging and Sound Association awarded the DxO ONE its prize for photo innovation for 2015–2016. DxO also created a website where photographers can showcase images taken with the DxO ONE.

It was discontinued in 2018.

== Specifications ==
- 20.2 megapixel 1-inch format BSI-CMOS image sensor
- Records still images in JPEG, RAW (DNG), and SuperRAW (DXO) formats
- Metering modes: Auto, Program, Shutter-priority, Aperture-priority, and Manual
- Scene modes: Sports, Landscape, Portrait, and Nighttime
- Exposure compensation adjustment
- ISO settings range from 100 to 12,800 plus 25,600 and 51,200 (Hi 1 and Hi 2) and Auto
- Focus via contrast-detect Autofocus, with face-detection, or via the touchscreen on the connected mobile device
- Video recording with single-channel audio in 1080p 30fps, or 720p 120fps for slow-motion
- microSD card slot for recording images and videos
- microUSB connector for charging and transferring images and videos to a computer

The DxO ONE included a SuperRAW image format that records raw images in quick succession for later post-processing. Temporal noise reduction was then performed on the set of images.

It could be rotated up to 60 degrees each way once connected via the Lightning connector. For capturing a Selfie, it could be reversed to face towards the user.

== Requirements ==
The DxO ONE worked with iPads and iPhones running iOS 8 or later and that had a lightning connector. The DxO ONE could be used on its own, with its rear OLED screen allowing the user to switch between photo and video, but not to preview the image. This was later updated by firmware to allow the rear screen to be used as a framing assistant.

For desktop processing of raw and SuperRAW images, an Apple Mac or Windows computer was required. Images were transferred using a separate application, DxO Connect, via cable (or by directly using the microSD card that was used in the camera). Apple added support for processing DxO ONE raw files in Digital Camera Raw 6.17 and Adobe added support for them in Camera Raw 9.2.

== See also ==
- List of large sensor fixed-lens cameras
