= Nik Software =

Software development company

- Formerly: Nik Multimedia
- Industry: Digital image processing, software development
- Founded: 1995
- Founder: Nils Kokemohr
- Defunct: 2012
- Headquarters: San Diego, California, United States
- Key people: Michael J Slater (CEO); Nils Kokemohr (CTO); Adam Christianson (Chief Web Developer)
- Products: Capture NX; Complete Collection; Efex; penPalette; Snapseed; TypeEfex
- Owner: The TECHNik Group (Germany)
- Number of employees: 120 (2010)

Nik Software was a software development company established in 1995 as Nik Multimedia Inc. and based in San Diego, California. The company developed multiple image editing plug-ins and tools for digital image processing software applications. Nik Software was acquired by Google in 2012.

== History ==
Nik Multimedia was founded in 1995 by Nils Kokemohr in Hamburg. The firm focused on digital photography and graphic design. They initially developed Nils Efex! and Nils Type Efex! which were a combination of Photoshop extensions and textures. The firm was then acquired in 1998 by the TECHnik Group and re-launched to focus on the expansion of the digital imaging and photographic markets. In 1999 Michael J Slater joined as CEO of the company which subsequently grew into a respected software research and development company.

In February 2006 the company was renamed Nik Software and announced an investment and cooperation Agreement with Nikon Corporation, who in 2010 held a 35% stake in the company. In 2010, the company had 120 employees — around 40 of whom were located in San Diego where the company was headquartered while the remaining staff (primarily engineering) were based in Hamburg, Germany.

In September 2012, Nik Software was acquired by Google for an undisclosed amount.

== Products ==
=== Neal's Efex ===
Neal's Efex and Type Efex were the first two products to be marketed by Nik Multimedia inc. they offered a collection of extensions for Photoshop 4 to alter the look of typefaces.

=== Complete Collection ===
In 2009, Nik packaged its range of award-winning photo editing plugin applications Dfine 2.0, Viveza, Color Efex Pro 3.0, Silver Efex Pro and Sharpener Pro 3.0 together in a single Collection. The Complete Collection Ultimate Edition sold for US$599.95 and the Complete Collection for Lightroom and Aperture for US$299.95.

After acquisition, Google relaunched the collection of six applications as the Google Nik Collection and reduced its price to $150 and then, in 2016, made it completely free to use.

In 2017 Google sold the, now seven-application, collection to DxO Labs for an undisclosed amount. DxO Labs have since added an eighth application: Perspective Efex.

=== Snapseed ===
Snapseed is an image editing application. It was initially released in 2011 for iOS. Subsequent versions were designed to run on MacOS and Microsoft Windows. Following the take-over, in December 2012, Google released Snapseed for Android and the desktop versions were discontinued.

=== Capture NX ===
Capture NX is a stand-alone photo editing program co-developed by Nik Software and Nikon, released in 2006. A new version of the program, Capture NX 2, was released in 2008.
