= Live from the Grill-O-Mat =

Episode of Monty Python's Flying Circus

"Live from the Grill-O-Mat" is the fifth episode of Series 2 of Monty Python's Flying Circus. This show aired 27 October 1970 and was recorded 10 September 1970. The episode featured sketches including "Blackmail", "Society for Putting Things on Top of Other Things", "Accidents Sketch (Prawn Salad Ltd.)" and "The Butcher Who is Alternately Rude and Polite".

== Introduction ==
The program begins with John Cleese (ostentatiously portraying himself) speaking "live" from a table at the Grill-O-Mat snack bar in Paignton; followed by the opening credits. Serving as the official host for the entire episode, he provides a means by which to link the various sketches together.

== "Blackmail" ==
This sketch features Michael Palin wearing a leopard-print jacket as the host of a television show which attempts to blackmail its viewers by showing pictures or film of them engaging in compromising acts of a sexual nature. The address to where the blackmailed viewers are to send their payments is "Behind The Hot Water Pipes, Third Washroom Along, Victoria Station".

== "Society for Putting Things on Top of Other Things" ==
In this sketch, Sir William (Graham Chapman), the President of the Royal Society for Putting Things on Top of Other Things, tells about how their Staffordshire branch has not succeeded on putting one thing on top of another before Cutler (John Cleese) who is delegate of Staffordshire, tells him that the whole branch thinks the whole thing is a bit silly. After some objections, Sir William agrees and dissolves the society before going out for a pipe. As he does so, he finds himself on film (rather than tape) and, upon checking another door and a window, discovers that the room is "surrounded by film". He informs the society of the predicament and after they do a round of checking it out, they decide to tunnel their way out as well as vaulting over a vaulting horse while two Germans (Ian Davidson and Terry Gilliam) mock them about their predicament before Cutler called out that he had just found another exit. The moment they got through, they are sent down a tunnel, into someone's digestive system.

== "Current Affairs" ==
Mr. Praline (Cleese) and his roommate, Brooky (Idle), do a new half hour show on current affairs, but due to the show being too long, their scene has been cut, the floor manager (Terry Jones) tells them about this, but gives them an offer to appear in another sketch if they can find a piano stool. After accepting it, Praline hears something and placed his ear down into the floor to hear the Society of Putting Things on Top of Other Things travelling down a pipe.

This later followed an animation of the society entering a mech-like figure and as they manage to control it, they end up defeated by another one before Sir William is knocked into "The Last Supper", spilling an entire bottle of Chateau Latour before he is sent into a cloud where he reunites with the other members. Some people on another cloud tells them not to jump as the fire brigade, on a red cloud, are coming before they're shot down by a Nazi on a cloud-like jet as the members notice him coming back.

== "Accidents Sketch (Prawn Salad Ltd.)" ==
Eric Idle plays an innocent-looking but seemingly accident-prone man who enters an establishment called 'Prawn Salad Ltd', and is blamed for setting off a series of catastrophic events.

During the course of about a minute of sketch time, circumstantial evidence relentlessly piles up indicating that Idle's character breaks an expensive mirror, knocks over an ornate bookcase, fatally stabs the maid (Carol Cleveland), causes the handy man to fall out the window to his death, induces an investigating policeman into a fatal heart attack, collapses the roof in on the butler who was trying to help the policeman, and finally, causes the entire 'Prawn Salad Ltd' building to explode.

The running gag of the skit is that while everyone in the sketch is convinced of the Idle character's complicity, the viewer is perfectly aware of his innocence in the series of events.

== "The Butcher Who is Alternately Rude and Polite" ==
Michael Palin plays a customer at a butcher's attempting to buy a chicken and some stuffing, but is confused by the butcher (Eric Idle) who is alternately rude ("Don't give me that posh talk you nasty stuck-up twit") and polite ("That's all right sir, call again.") Palin's character attempts to ignore the rude comments at first, but later confronts the proprietor about his behavior. The sketch ends after Idle's characters' last rude comment by going back to Cleese's narrator character at the eponymous Grill-O-Mat, who has appeared between most of the sketches as a method of linking the sketches.

The sketch is preceded by an animation of two identical United States Civil War generals, one of whom expresses his desire to "hunt piggy banks". The figures are actually photographs of U.S. military figure and Massachusetts governor Benjamin Franklin Butler.

== See also ==
- List of Monty Python's Flying Circus episodes
