= Decapping exoribonuclease =

Enzyme found in humans

DXO

Identifiers
- Aliases: DXO, DOM3L, DOM3Z, NG6, RAI1, decapping exoribonuclease
- External IDs: OMIM: 605996; MGI: 1890444; GeneCards: DXO
Available structures
PDB	Ortholog search: PDBe RCSB
PDB	List of PDB id codes 3FQI, 3FQJ, 4J7L, 4J7M, 4J7N

Gene location (Human)
Chr.	Chromosome 6 (human)
Band	6p21.33	Start	31,969,810 bp
Band	6p21.33	End	31,972,290 bp

Gene location (Mouse)
Chr.	Chromosome 17 (mouse)
Band	17|17 B1	Start	35,055,995 bp
Band	17|17 B1	End	35,058,209 bp
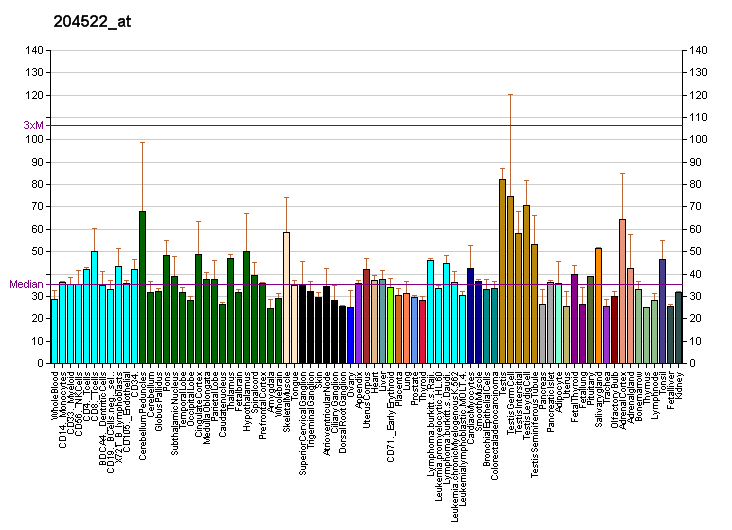

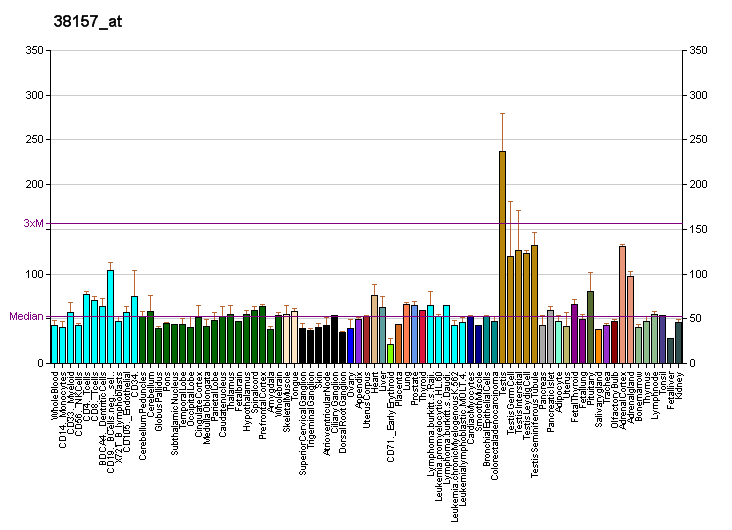

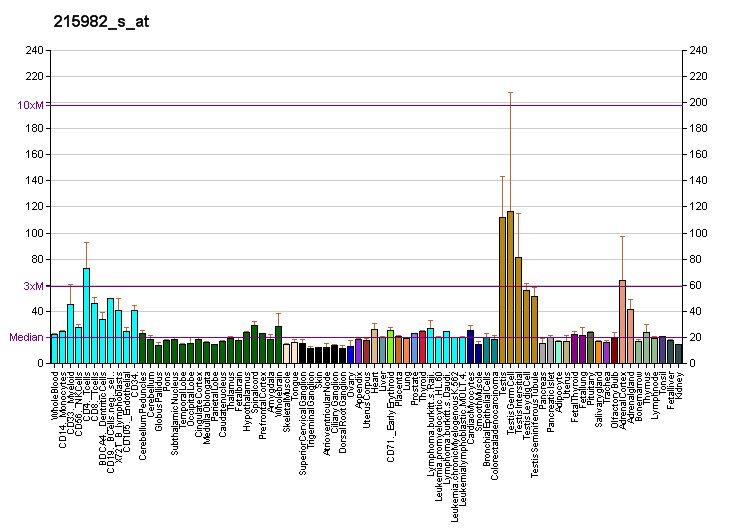
RNA expression pattern
Bgee	Human / Mouse (ortholog); Top expressed in: left testis; right testis; pituitary gland; anterior pituitary; right hemisphere of cerebellum; left adrenal cortex; right lobe of liver; right adrenal gland; right adrenal cortex; left ovary / Top expressed in: spermatocyte; spermatid; tail of embryo; otic vesicle; internal carotid artery; external carotid artery; granulocyte; yolk sac; saccule; right kidney; More reference expression data
BioGPS	More reference expression data
Gene ontology
Molecular function	nucleotide binding; nuclease activity; 5'-3' exonuclease activity; exonuclease activity; mRNA binding; RNA pyrophosphohydrolase activity; hydrolase activity; magnesium ion binding; metal ion binding; RNA binding
Cellular component	plasma membrane; nucleus; cytosol
Biological process	nuclear mRNA surveillance; mRNA catabolic process; RNA destabilization; nucleic acid phosphodiester bond hydrolysis
Sources:Amigo / QuickGO
Orthologs
Databases	NCBI: entry; OMA: entry
Species	Human	Mouse
Entrez	1797	112403
Ensembl	ENSG00000204348; ENSG00000236765; ENSG00000224313; ENSG00000206346; ENSG00000225682 ENSG00000234798	ENSMUSG00000040482
UniProt	O77932	O70348
RefSeq (mRNA)	NM_005510; NM_001371205; NM_001371206	NM_001163770; NM_033613
RefSeq (protein)	NP_005501; NP_001358134; NP_001358135	NP_001157242; NP_291091
Location (UCSC)	Chr 6: 31.97 – 31.97 Mb	Chr 17: 35.06 – 35.06 Mb
PubMed search
- Wikidata
View/Edit Human	View/Edit Mouse

Decapping exoribonuclease is an enzyme that in humans is encoded by the gene DXO (previously DOM3Z).

This gene localizes to the major histocompatibility complex (MHC) class III region on chromosome 6. The function of its protein product is unknown, but its ubiquitous expression and conservation in both simple and complex eukaryotes suggests that this may be a housekeeping gene.
