= Film emulation =

Digital image processing technique

In photography, Film emulation describes a series of editing techniques used to give images captured digitally the appearance of being captured with photographic film. The techniques involve manipulating specific characteristics like film grain, halation, light reflection, bloom, film artifacts, etc. To emulate film, those characteristics are studied and mathematical algorithms are developed using the resulting data. These algorithms can then be applied to the digital files. The results are images which closely resemble photographs or motion pictures captured on analogue media, even though they were taken digitally.

== Emulation techniques ==
=== Colour ===
Photochemical film colour response refers to the colours film produces when hit by specific wavelengths of light from the scene. Because all photography inherently loses data with capture, this colour response is not accurate to life. Different film stocks have different colour responses. As part of the design process of film stocks, colour scientists and chemists work to design a colour response that is visually appealing in as many situations as possible.

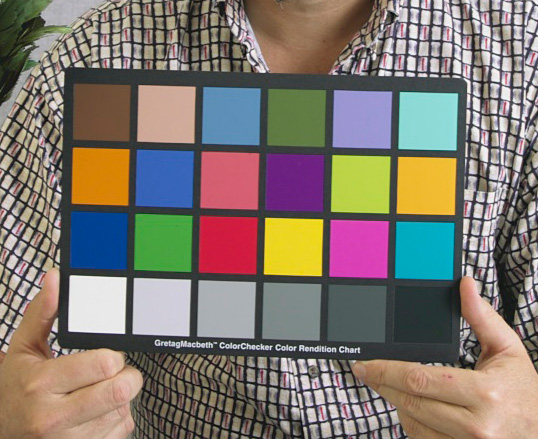
Colour chart used to accurately match camera colour responses

Colour response is emulated by collecting data on both film and digital colour response, then designing accurate colour transformations. Data collection is done by capturing images with both film and digital cameras in controlled conditions. This is usually using a colour chart with several exposure levels. The film is then scanned using a digital scanner. At this point, the colour information of both sets of images exists as data in a standard color space, i.e. as a series of numbers.

Colour transformations is the math derived to transform one set of colours to another. These derivations are found using techniques known as tone mapping and 3d colour geometry. Once these transformations have been created they will then generalise to all data captured from that digital camera, and can be applied using a LUT.

=== Film grain ===
Film grain is the microscopic particles of metallic silver that make up the image. Silver halides are distributed unevenly in the depth of emulsion layer. Tiny grains do not exist alone, forming complex conglomerations.

There are primarily two main methods for film grain emulation:

- Procedural generation: this method is relatively simpler to implement and does not necessitate the inclusion of extensive scans in the installation process. However, to avoid repetitive patterns, numerous scans are still required. In the case of replicating natural grain, significant processing power is necessary, and the rendering frame rate may be reduced.
- Scanning real footage: this approach involves digitally scanning authentic film footage as a reference for emulation. It provides a more accurate representation of the specific characteristics of different films. It requires access to a diverse range of scans to ensure versatility in the emulation process.

=== Bloom ===
Bloom is the combined effect of bright light dispersion on the boundaries of contrasting image areas, which originates in the optical system, and then is distorted and amplified in the multiple layers of the photographic emulsion.

In digital photography and video, bloom can be emulated by adding a blur or glare effect around bright areas of the image.

=== Halation ===
Film halation is a visual effect that appear when shooting on a film as a red-orange halo near the contrasting boundaries of over-exposed areas, as well as a red glare in the mid-tones. Halation is very typical around specular highlights on reflective surfaces.

This can be emulated by adding a blur or glow effect around bright areas of the image.

=== Camera and projector mechanical effects ===
The features mostly related to the film movement and shutter effects, typical for any device with film transportation and mechanical shutter — be it a camera, projector or video coding device (telecine or scanner).

=== Dust and scratches ===
Digital images often lack these artifacts, or they are deliberately removed during the image editing process.

=== Film softness ===
This nuanced attribute selectively masks high-frequency details in an image. The amount of softness largely depends on the grain size of the film. Larger grain results in a less detailed image, where crisp edges and textures become less pronounced, without losing larger details that define the contents of the image. The softness of film is simulated using grain rendering. By controlling the distribution and size of the digital grains making up the image, it's possible to reproduce film softness without it appearing artificially blurred..

=== Adding specific film elements ===
This includes features like perforations, keyсode and film gates of different shapes.

== Notable examples in cinema ==
=== Star Wars: The Last Jedi (2017) and Knives Out (2019) ===
According to director Rian Johnson, about half of the film Star Wars: The Last Jedi was shot using film cameras, and half was shot using digital cameras. "We started shooting mostly film and by the end we were shooting mostly digital." The footage shoot with digital cameras was matched to the film footage in the post production process.

After the success of achieving a consistent look with Star Wars: The Last Jedi, Johnson's next film, Knives Out was shot entirely with digital cameras. This was on the advice of the film's cinematographer, Steve Yedlin (who was also the cinematographer of Star Wars: The Last Jedi). As it was possible to produce an image with a digital camera and emulation that is almost indistinguishable from film, Yedlin advocated choosing a camera for other reasons than the look it created.

The choice of camera was instead based on the extent to which it met the needs of the movie's logistics. For example, shooting digital meant the filmmakers did not have to wait days to see their dailies while the photochemical film was sent to a lab to be developed. They could also choose a camera that was reliable, precise, and versatile, without being limited to one format.

The post production process would have been the same whether the movie was shot photochemically or digitally, with the same digital post chain and digital colour correction process. Shooting digital removed the extra process of doing digital scans of film, and the labour involved in ensuring high fidelity in the scans. By not having photochemical film artifacts embedded in the captured footage, there was more control of the extent of the artifacts in post. Yedlin considered it to be easier to add halation and grain to digital video than to remove them from film footage.

=== The Holdovers (2023) ===
The Holdovers shot with the Arri Alexa Mini and a film look was emulated, inspired by 1970s cinema. This involved not only emulating the style of film stocks, but also emulating film degradation. Cinematographer Eigil Bryld explained that the goal was making the film look like it had been made in the 1970s, forgotten, and then found in a can in someone’s garage. According to Bryld, director Alexander Payne didn't want it to "just look like a movie set the '70s. He really wanted it to look and feel and sound like it was a movie that was actually made in the '70s."

Early in the pre-production process, Bryld intended to use '70s film stocks, but abandoned this prospect quickly as the stocks and equipment weren't readily available. Joe Gawler, a colourist who had experience doing film restoration, worked with Bryld to create the project LUT and on creating the emulated degradation.

The approach was to be inspired by the filmmaking and aesthetics of the '70s, without needing to use the specific tools used in the '70s. This approach was taken throughout the project. Payne and Bryld made extensive use of cinema LED lights in the film but did not use high powered HMI (hydrargyrum medium-arc iodide) lights. This is despite HMI technology existing in the '70s, and despite cinema LED lights not existing in the '70s. Their reasoning was that the low budget filmmakers they were drawing inspiration from would have used LED lights had they been available in the '70s. They would not have used the much more expensive HMIs for low budget projects.

== Reason for use ==
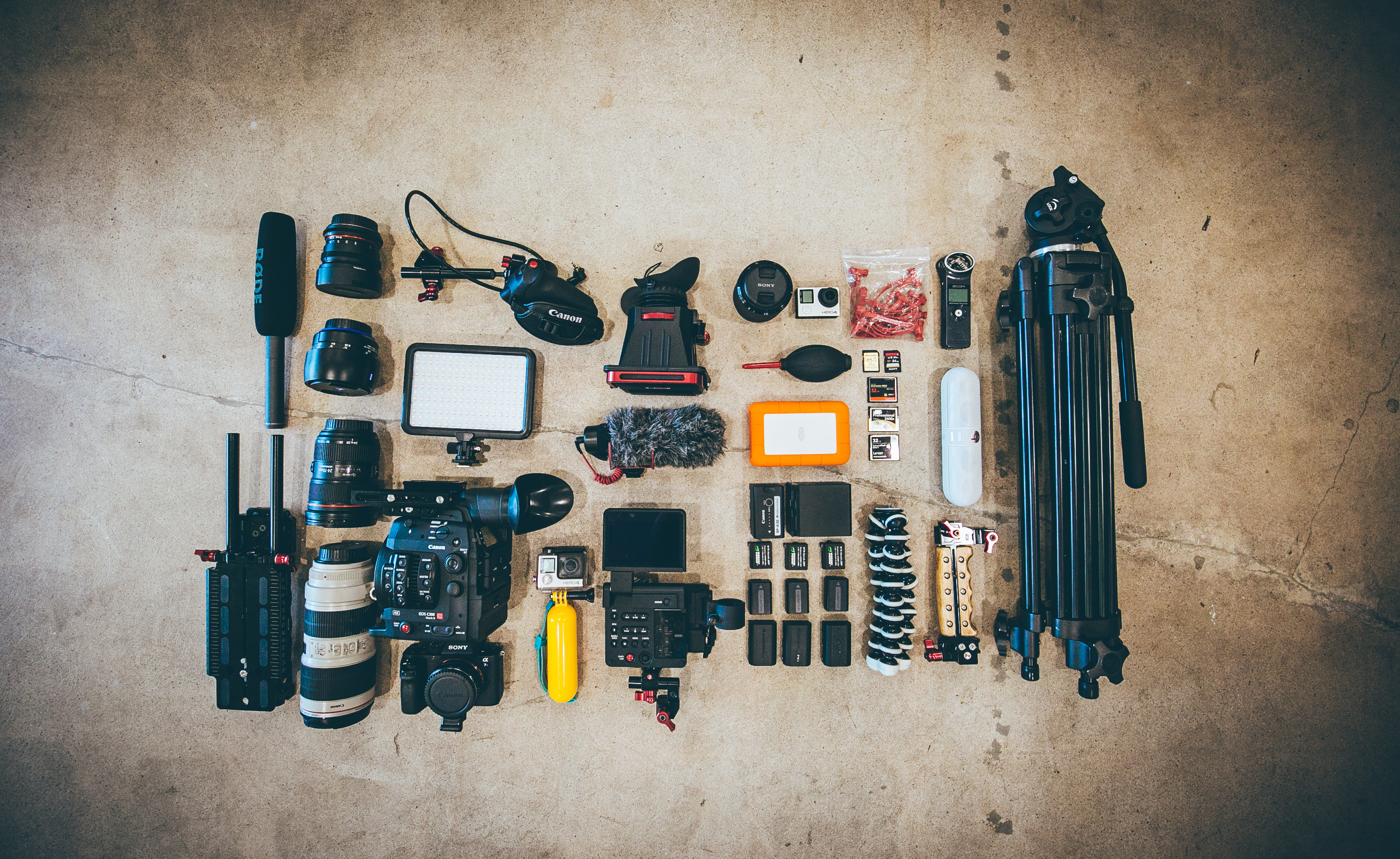
Example of a set of equipment for digital photography

There are several reasons why film emulation is a popular technology.

- Film cameras may be more affordable than professional digital equipment, however, they require specific handling skills and the need for expensive film stock, processing and scanning.
- The ability to edit a digital image at any time directly on the camera
- Digital content is created faster than film content.
- Film emulation effectively deals with a variety of digital problems such as excessive image sharpness, posterization, aesthetic colours, and contrast.
- The ability to recreate the specific characteristics of various types of film for any digital image at any production stage
- Film emulation is often utilized for nostalgic purposes, allowing creators to evoke the aesthetics of cinema from past eras.
- Film emulation allows you to add the "depth" and "warmth" of digital images that are typical of shooting on film.
- Since the emulsion of film contains gelatin the choice to shoot on film is not vegan, whereas film emulation is. Hence some people may prefer to use film emulation for ethical reasons.

== Difference from film simulation ==
- Film simulation gives an image the appearance of film as an abstract concept. In this case, the image receives the characteristics not of a specific historically existing film, but of some stereotypical properties. For example, the film simulation mode in Fuji cameras using Classic Chrome or Nostalgic Negative modes.
- Film emulation always presupposes the existence of a historical analogue whose specific characteristics have been emulated in the image. The creation of a film profile is preceded by studying the selected sample, scanning, sampling, building mathematical models, and studying the nuances of color rendering. All of these steps are designed to accurately recreate the aesthetics of a specific film, such as Kodak Supra 100 or Fujicolor Pro 400H.

Black and white, colour negative and reversal; 8mm, 16mm, 35mm and 65mm film gauges – many film stocks have come and have subsequently been discontinued, and specialist developing processes once available to filmmakers no longer exist (production of some Kodachrome products was discontinued by the end of 2000, for example) In many cases the only way for contemporary photography to contain the aesthetic of older film and video technology is to replicate it through post-production tools.

== See also ==
- Comparison of digital and film photography
- Digital content
