= Film grain =

Optical texture of processed photographic film

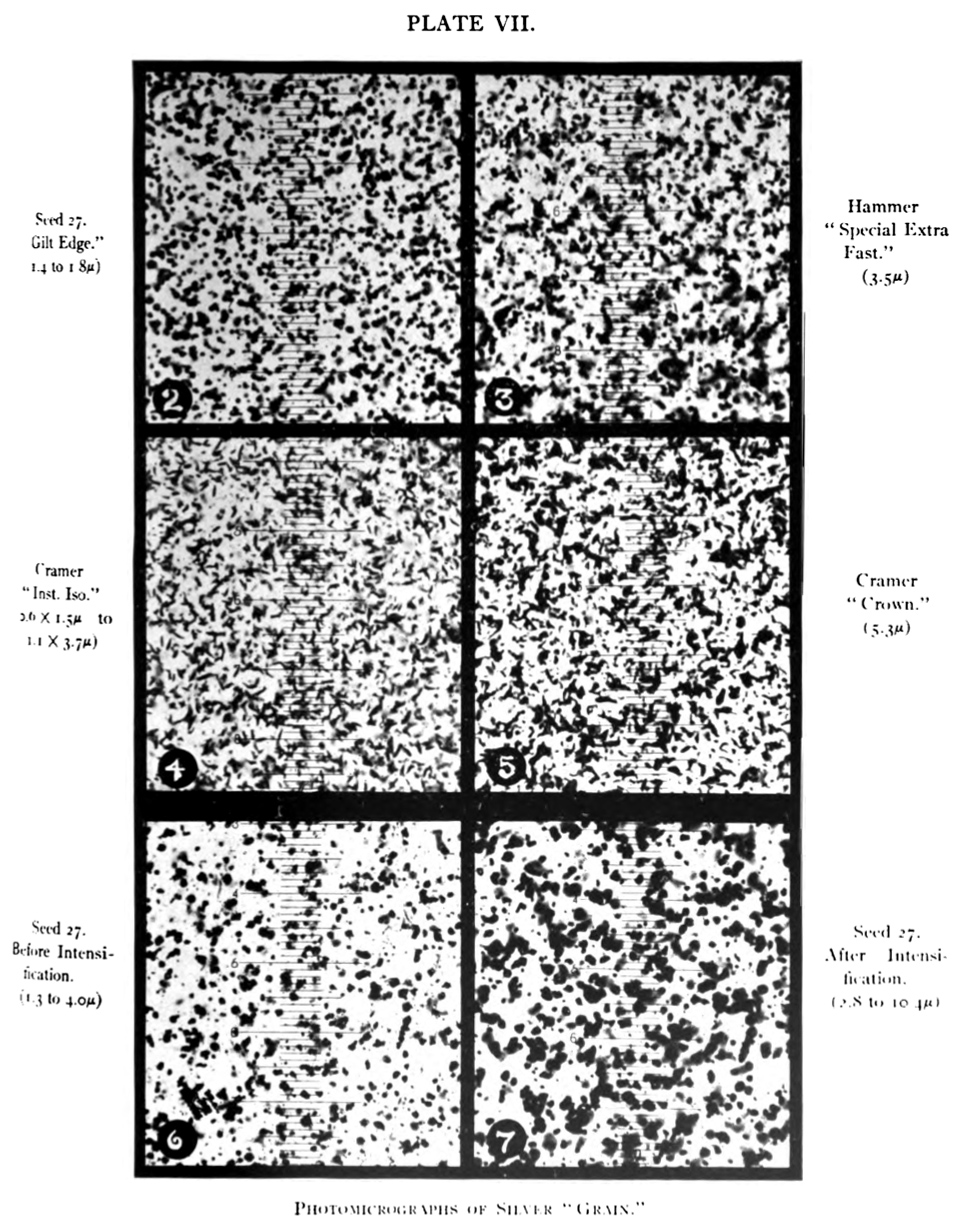
Photomicrograph of grain of different photographic plates

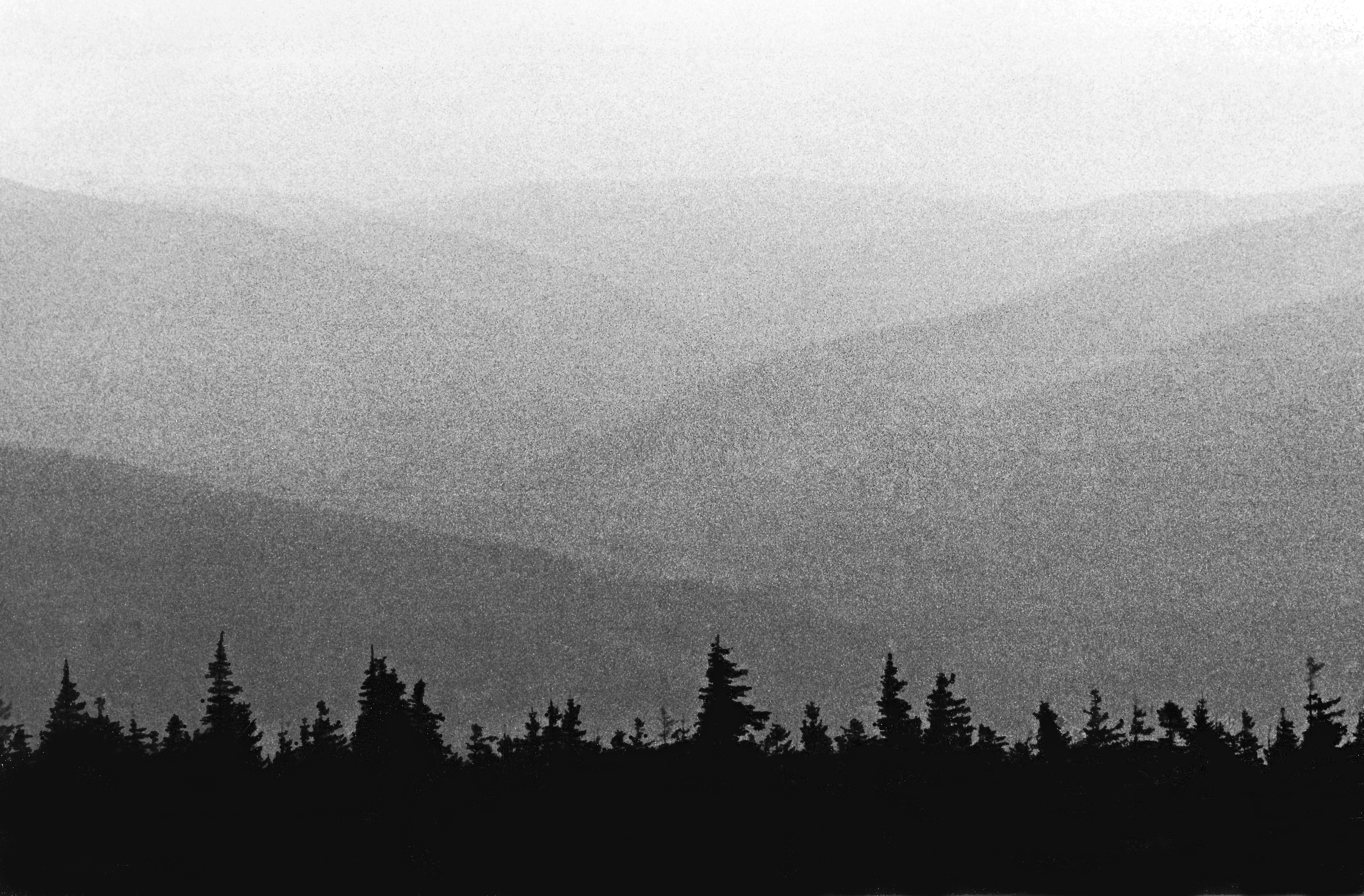
Film grain used for artistic effect

Film grain or film granularity is the random optical texture of processed photographic film. Film grain develops due to the presence of small particles of metallic silver, or dye clouds, developed from silver halide that have received enough photons. While film grain is a function of such particles (or dye clouds) it is not a particle but an optical effect. The magnitude of the effect (also known as amount of grain) depends on both the film stock and the definition at which it is observed. It can be objectionably noticeable in an over-enlarged film photograph.

== Chemical background ==
The size and morphology of the silver halide grains play crucial role in the image characteristics and exposure behavior. There is a tradeoff between the crystal size and light sensitivity (film speed); larger crystals have better chance to receive enough energy to flip them into developable state, as they have higher probability of receiving several photons needed for forming the Ag_{4} clusters that start the autocatalytic process of development. Large crystals will therefore give more sensitive film, for the price of being visibly grainier. Fine grain better preserves details but requires more light.

Tabular-grain film uses crystals of flat morphology, with width-to-thickness ratios of at least two, often much more. The flat morphology allows better overlapping of the crystals, reducing intergranular space and giving more black for the same amount of silver. The more compact structure allows for thinner emulsion layers. It is also more difficult to wash during the fixing stage. Tabular crystals also better absorb sensitizing dyes. They also scatter the light less, giving sharper image but less gradation. Tabular crystals also have less chance of absorbing high energy photons from ambient and cosmic radiation, giving longer shelf life without fogging. The tabular crystals can be favored during synthesis by an extra step, where the formed crystal seeds of undesired morphology are dissolved and the remaining ones grow by controlled Ostwald ripening.

"Classical", cubic-grain emulsion provides more random distribution of the crystal shapes and sizes, resulting in more "forgiving" film tolerant to wider range of exposures.

Both morphologies can also be modified for a core-shell structure, with a small silver halide grain being surrounded by one or more light-capturing layers, or a more light-sensitive center is surrounded by more developer-sensitive shell. This gives finer grain for the same film speed. One of possibilities is an iodide-rich core and iodide-poor shell, giving high sensitivity to light inside and high sensitivity to developer outside.

Both morphologies can also come in different distribution of sizes; "monosize", with narrow distribution of crystal dimensions, gives better control of the film speed and less visible grain (due to absence of larger crystals). Wider, more random size variation gives more tolerance to exposure (for too little light there are some big crystals, for too much light there are some little grains), and more tolerance to development process.

Rod-shaped grains, the opposite to tabular grains, can undergo self-development even in absence of light, resulting in fogging.

== Measures ==
=== RMS granularity ===
Granularity, or RMS granularity, is a numerical quantification of density non-uniformity, equal to the root-mean-square (rms) fluctuations in optical density, measured with a microdensitometer with a 0.048 mm (48-micrometre) diameter circular aperture, on a film area that has been exposed and normally developed to a mean density of 1.0 D (that is, it transmits 10% of light incident on it).

Granularity is sometimes quoted as "diffuse RMS granularity times 1000", so that a film with granularity 10 means an rms density fluctuation of 0.010 in the standard aperture area.

When the particles of silver are small, the standard aperture area measures an average of many particles, so the granularity is small. When the particles are large, fewer are averaged in the standard area, so there is a larger random fluctuation, and a higher granularity number.

=== Selwyn granularity ===
Film grain is also sometimes quantified in a way that is relative independent of size of the aperture through which the microdensitometer measures it, using R. Selwyn's observation (known as Selwyn's law) that, for a not too small aperture, the product of RMS granularity and the square root of aperture area tends to be independent of the aperture size. The Selwyn granularity is defined as:

$$G = \sigma\sqrt{2a}$$

where σ is the RMS granularity and a is the aperture area.

== Grain effect with film and digital ==
The images below show an example of extreme film grain:

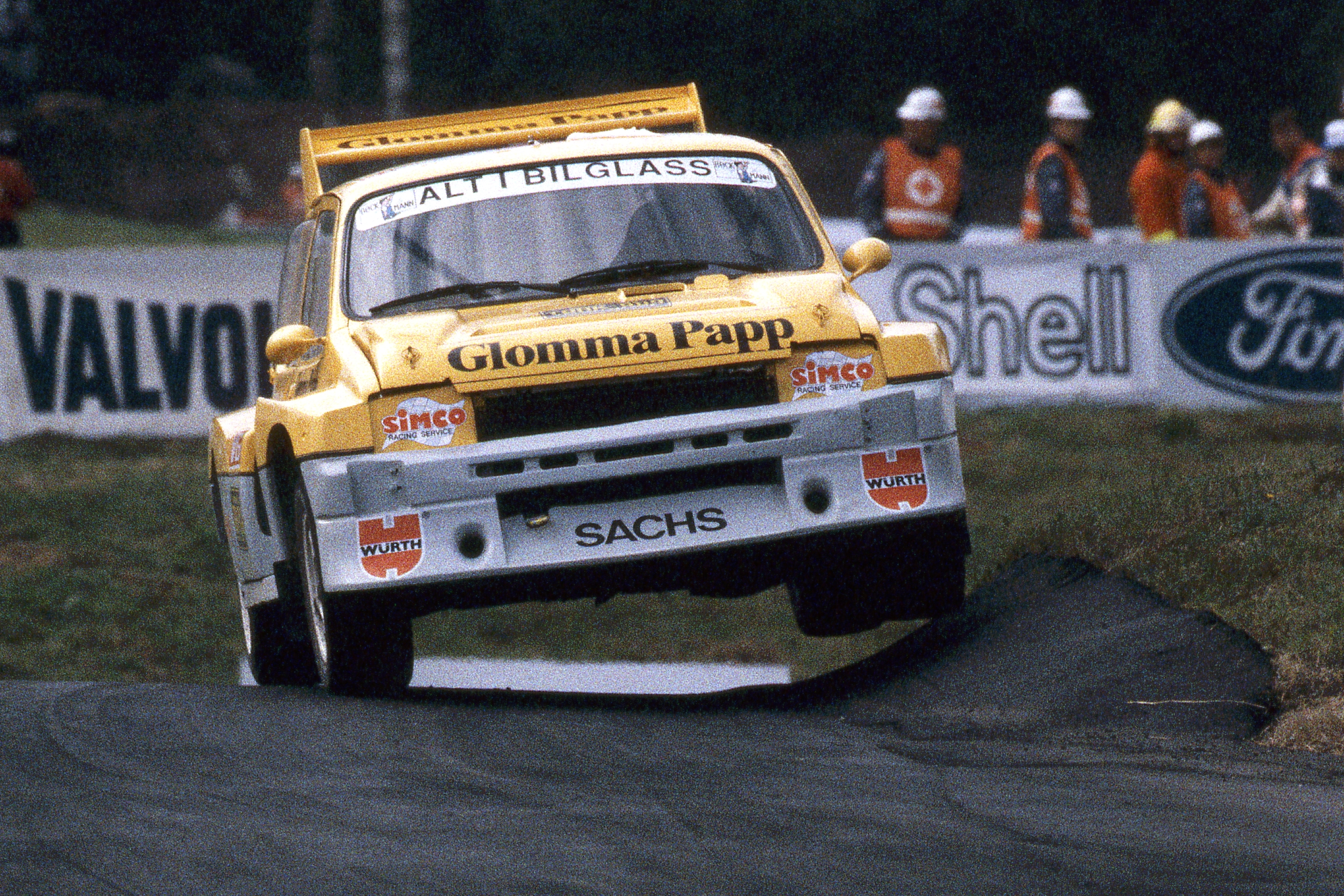
Rallycross car pictured on Agfa 1000 RS slide

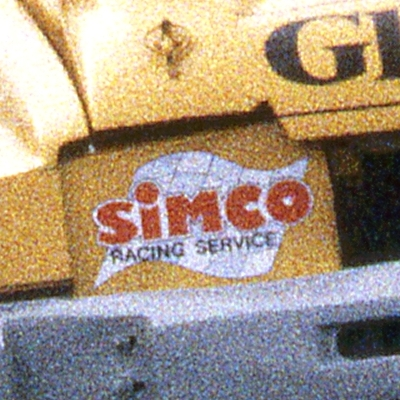
Detail of the same photo to show the grain better

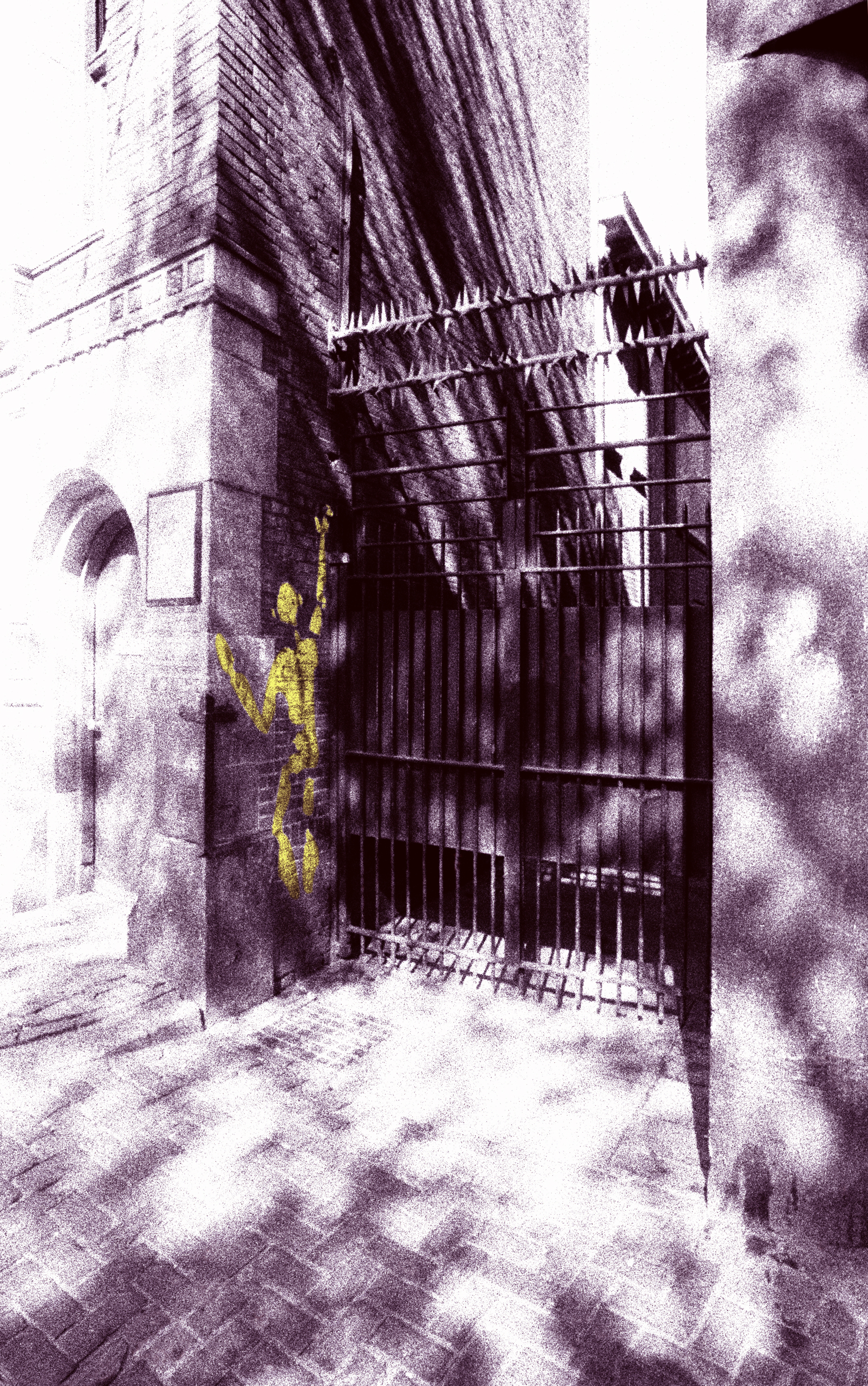
Recording Kodak Film 1000 ASA, Amsterdam, Graffiti 1996

Digital photography does not naturally exhibit film grain, since there is no film for any grain to exist within. In digital cameras, the closest physical equivalents of film grains are the individual elements of the image sensor (e.g. CCD cell), the pixels; just as small-grain film has better resolution but less sensitivity than large-grain film, so will an image sensor with more elements result in an image with better resolution but less light per pixel. Thus, like film grain, physical pixel size represents the compromise between resolution and sensitivity. However, while film grains are randomly distributed and have size variation, image sensor cells are of same size and are arranged in a grid, so direct comparison of film and digital resolutions is not straightforward. Instead, the ISO setting on a digital camera controls the gain of the electronic amplifier on the readout circuitry of the chip. Ultimately, high ISO settings on a digital camera operating in low light conditions does result in a noisy image, but the visual appearance is somewhat different from traditional photographic film.

The visual and artistic effect of film grain can be simulated in some digital photo manipulation programs by adding grain to a digital image after it is taken. Various raw image processing software packages (such as RawTherapee and DxO PhotoLab) feature "film simulation" effects that apply the characteristics of various film brands, including the graininess. Plugins for the same purpose also exist for various image editors such as Photoshop (e.g. in Nik Collection's Analog Efex and Silver Efex).

In digital photography, image noise sometimes appears as a "grain-like" effect.

== Film grain overlay ==
Film grain overlay, sometimes referred to as "FGO", is a process in which film emulsion characteristics are overlaid using different levels of opacity onto a digital file. This process adds film grain characteristics, and in instances with moving images, subtle flicker to the more sterile looking digital medium.

As opposed to computer plug-ins, FGO is typically derived from actual film grain samples taken from film, shot against a gray card.

Because film grain is difficult to encode because of its random nature, some video codecs, notably AV1, include film grain synthesis, where the film grain is removed during encoding and replaced with parameters that describe the shape and density of the particles, and during playback the decoder uses these parameters to resynthesize the film grain. In July 2025 Netflix announced that it was streaming film content using AV1 film grain synthesis at scale, after having used it for only a small number of titles when it introduced AV1 in 2021; in its tests the grain-synthesized streams needed lower bitrates and caused about 10 per cent fewer rebuffering events.

== See also ==
- Film speed
- Film emulation
