= DxO Labs =

French photography software company

DxO Labs SAS
- Company type: Private
- Industry: Software
- Predecessor: DO Labs
- Founded: January 14, 2003; 22 years ago in Paris, France
- Founder: Jérôme Ménière (Owner & CEO)
- Headquarters: Paris, France
- Area served: Worldwide
- Products: DxO PhotoLab; DxO ViewPoint; DxO PureRAW; DxO FilmPack; Nik Collection
- Number of employees: 89 (2021)
- Website: www.dxo.com

DxO Labs (formerly DO Labs) is a privately owned photography software company. It was founded in 2003 by Jérôme Ménière, former CEO of Vision-IQ. The company's headquarters are in Paris, France.

== History ==
Originally organized as a business unit of Vision IQ, a French software company founded in 1995 that specialized in computer vision, DO Labs was spun off to become an independent company after raising 7.3 million Euros of financing in venture capital.

When DO Labs released DxO Optics Pro in 2004, which became DxO PhotoLab in 2017, it was the first product on the market to offer a way to correct photographic issues caused by camera-body electronics and lens optics without human intervention. These automated corrections, based on mathematical models of the physical characteristics of camera bodies and lenses as well as on the metadata (Exif) captured with each image, meant no human variables were involved.

In 2005, following the OpenRAW campaign to simplify the interoperability of capture formats, RAW file support was introduced into DxO's products and subsequent releases featured additional automatic image enhancement technologies developed specifically for RAW files.

In 2006 Carl Zeiss Sports Optics partnered with DxO Labs on the Eyepiece DC 4 digital camera, which uses DxO's Image Signal Processing (ISP) technology.

Between 2006 and 2016, DxO Optics Pro won three EISA and two TIPA industry awards.

In 2007 DxO began producing Embedded Imaging devices for camera phones. However, by 2016 the product line had been divested, with most of the development team leaving for camera maker GoPro.

In 2008 DxO Labs created DxOMark.com, to publish image quality ratings for standalone cameras, lenses, and mobile devices that include cameras.

In 2010 version 5 of Adobe's Creative Suite signalled direct competition with DxO products by shipping with its own lens profiles for the first time. In 2013 Capture One also started offering automatic correction tools similar to those developed by DxO.

In 2017 DxOMark became an independent company, DxOMark Image Labs. On October 25, 2017, DxO announced the acquisition of the Nik Collection assets from Google.

In early 2018 the company entered bankruptcy and shut down the part of the business that had been producing the DxO ONE. Since 2018 DxO has focussed wholly on developing software and has subsequently won six TIPA awards, including Best imaging software for professionals in 2023.

In 2020 Nik Collection won the EISA award for Best Photo Editing Software.

== Products ==
DxO Labs currently markets the following image processing software packages.

- DxO PhotoLab: First released as DxO Optics Pro in 2004, DxO PhotoLab is digital image editing software package designed for photographers who shoot RAW. It offers automatic corrections for optical aberrations and image distortions for popular camera-lens combinations, as well as a range of other tools.
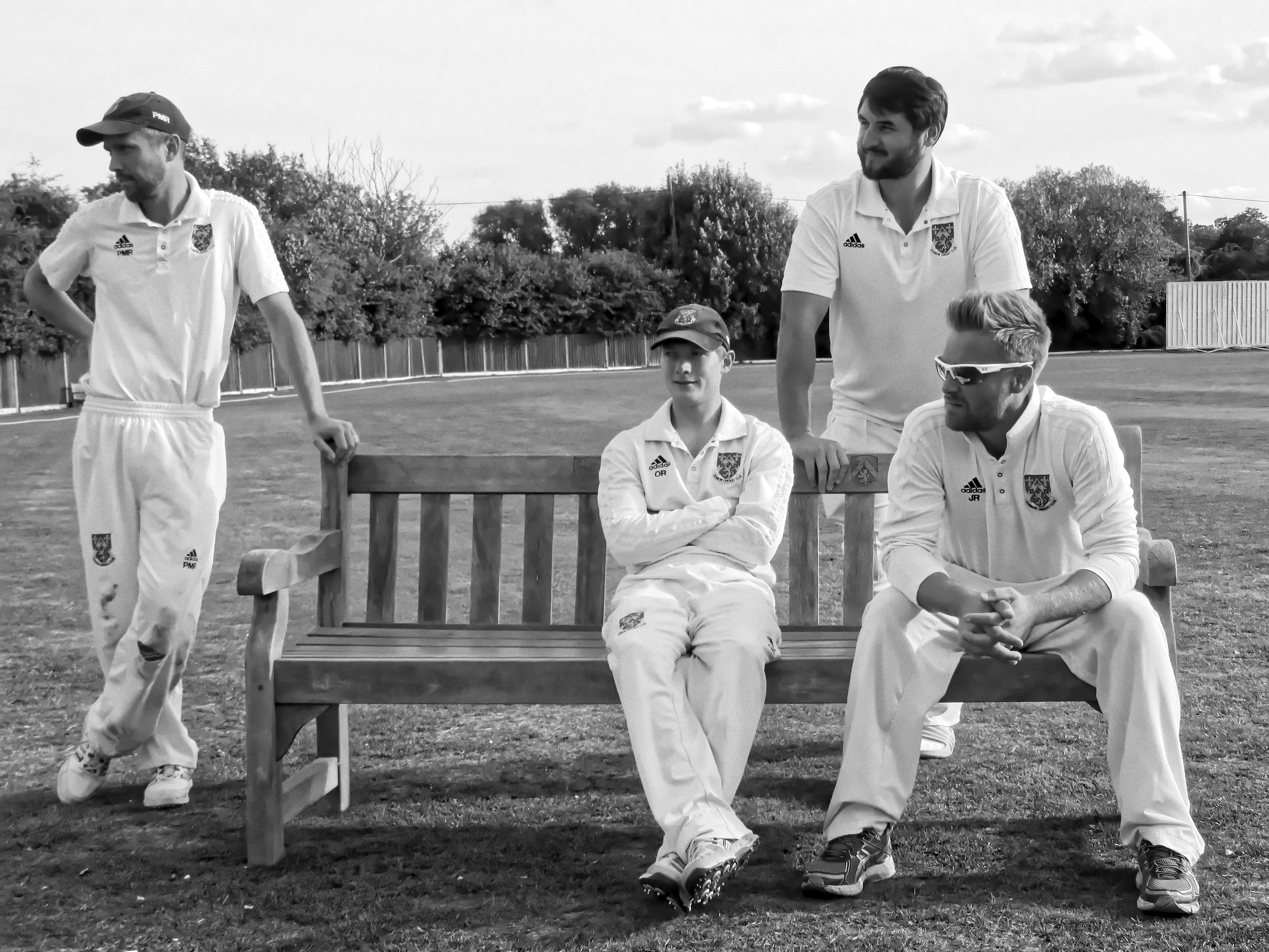
  Ilford FP4 Plus 125 emulation using DXO Filmpack 5 Elite
- DxO PureRAW: Launched in 2021 DxO PureRAW is essentially the RAW conversion engine developed for Optics Pro and PhotoLab. It is designed to remove noise, chromatic aberrations, vignetting, distortion, and lens softness to improve the overall quality of a single image or batch of photographs prior to editing in another program.
- DxO ViewPoint allows the user to correct anamorphosis, perspective, deformities, and lens distortions, especially those caused by shooting with wide-angle lenses.
- DxO FilmPack emulates the appearance of various conventional films digitally. Endorsed by photographer Sebastião Salgado in 2013. By digitizing film stocks DxO offers looks that match those of bygone positive and negative chemical processes. Modern revival films and specific digital looks are also offered.
- Nik Collection is a collection of 8 plugins and applications compatible with Adobe Lightroom and Adobe Photoshop. DxO acquired Nik Collection from Google on October 25, 2017, who in turn had acquired it from Nik Software in 2012. Nik Collection was first released as a DxO product in 2018.

=== Discontinued Products ===
- DxO Analyzer was a suite of software tools and equipment to test sensors, lenses, and standalone cameras, as well as mobile devices with cameras. Originally introduced by DxO Labs, DxO Analyzer is now a product of DxOMark Image Labs.
- Embedded imaging: in 2006 DxO raised 10.6m Euros to fund the development of Embedded Imaging devices for camera phones. The resulting range of devices was released in 2007. However, production had ceased by 2016.
- The DxO ONE was a phone-connected-camera. It was a small 20-megapixel, 1-inch-sensor, f/1.8 camera which plugs into a Lightning connector of an iPhone or iPad and uses the display to frame and shoot an image. The camera was discontinued in 2018.
- DxO Optics Pro was the first consumer product launched under the DxO banner by the then DO Labs in 2004. After 11 major releases it was superseded by DxO PhotoLab in 2017, the first DxO product to ship with the U Point technology that had been acquired from the purchase of Nik Collection from Google. However, users henceforth would have to buy both DxO FilmPack and DxO ViewPoint in order to keep the film renderings and perspective corrections that were integral to Optics Pro.

=== Main technologies ===
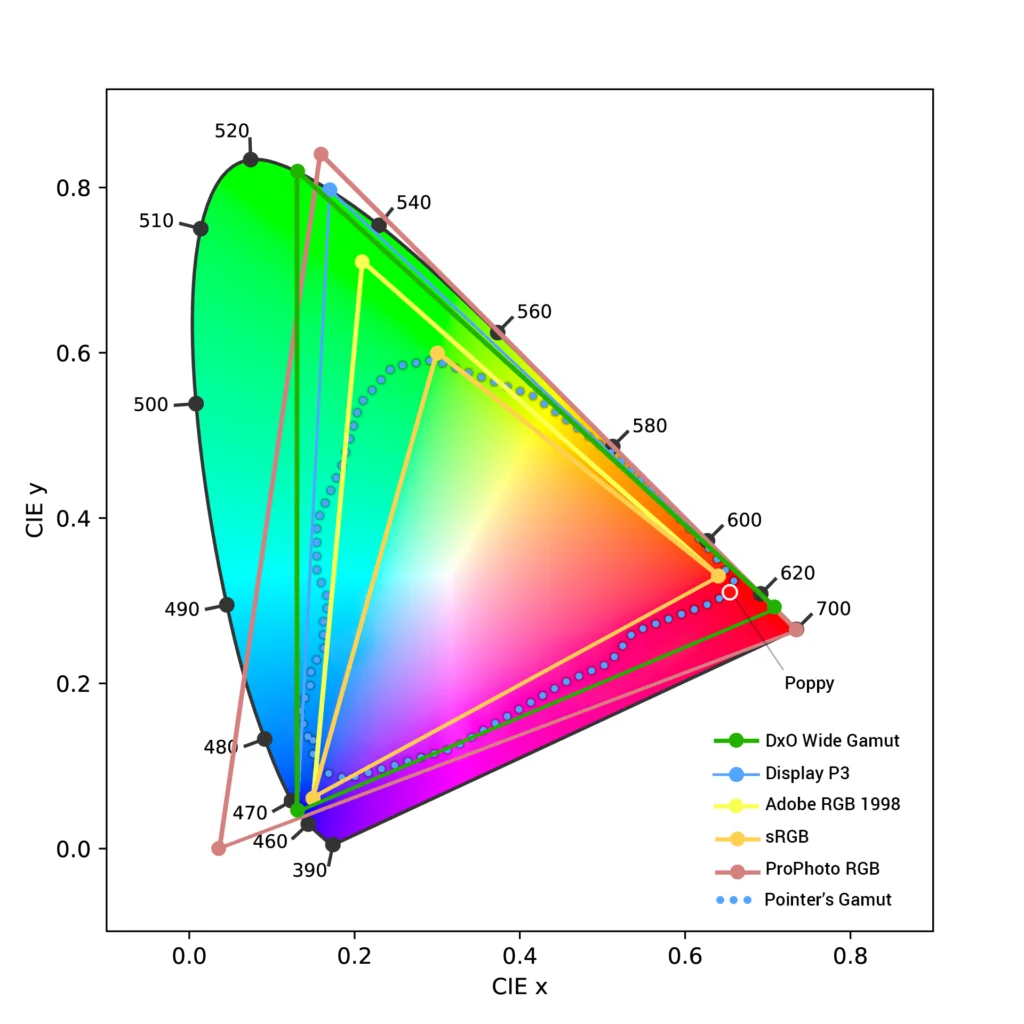
DxO Wide Gamut

DxO has developed a number of original technologies to underpin the features of current and past products, such as:

- Optics Modules - camera body and lens correction modules: originally called "Lens Correction Modules".
- DeepPRIME - a denoising and demosaicing engine trained by AI: in 2024, PureRAW 4 was accompanied by the latest generation of the DeepPRIME engine, known as XD2.
- Smartlighting - a mechanism to use the full dynamic range of the image: resolves most overexposures, lifts shadows while preserving bright areas, and recovers details in clipped areas.
- ClearView - a dehazing tool: intensifies the contrast to remove atmospheric veil and blur.
- U Point - Selection Technology: Acquired when DxO purchased the Nik Collection from Google. The basic idea is that you (U), the photographer, 'point at' what to adjust in the photo. Selections are based on the attributes of each pixel, such as hue, saturation, brightness, and contrast. So, masks are created using control points or control lines.
- Wide Gamut – a larger color space for photo editing: the native color of the sensor is converted to a working color to deliver an image that retains the luminance details of the sensor.
