= Nikon F2 =

1971 35mm single-lens reflex camera

Nikon F2 Photomic (DP-1 prism)
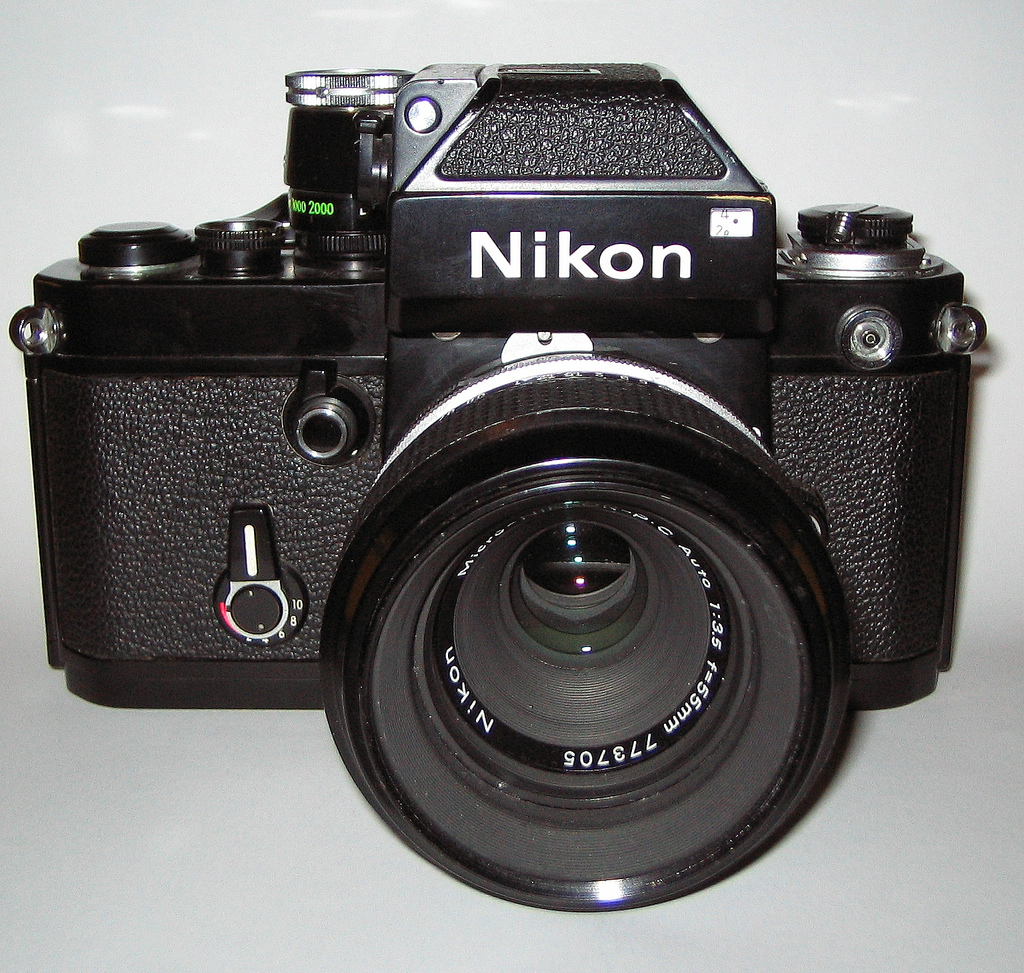
- Nikon F2 Photomic (DP-1 prism)

Overview
- Maker: Nikon (Nippon Kogaku K. K.)
- Type: 35 mm SLR camera
- Released: Sept 1971
- Production: 1971-1980

Lens
- Lens mount: Nikon F-mount

Sensor/medium
- Film format: 35 mm
- Film size: 36 mm × 24 mm

Focusing
- Focus: manual

Exposure/metering
- Exposure: manual

Flash
- Flash: non-ISO hot shoe plus PC socket

Shutter
- Frame rate: 4,3 fps with MD-2 motor drive

General
- Battery: 2x 1.5V SR44/S76 button cells (for light meter)
- Dimensions: 152.5×65×102 mm (6.00×2.56×4.02 in)
- Weight: 840 g (30 oz) without lens
- Made in: Japan

Chronology
- Successor: Nikon F3

The Nikon F2 is a professional-level 35 mm single-lens reflex (SLR) camera. It was manufactured by the Japanese optics company Nippon Kogaku K. K. (Nikon Corporation since 1988) in Japan from September 1971 to 1980. It used a horizontal-travel focal plane shutter with titanium shutter curtains and a speed range of 1 to 1/2000 second (up to 10 seconds using the self-timer) plus Bulb and Time, and flash X-sync of 1/80 second. It had dimensions (with DE-1 head, see below) of 98 mm height, 152.5 mm width, 65 mm depth and 730 g weight. It was available in two colors: black with chrome trim and all black. The F2 was adopted by both casual photographers and professional photographers, the latter of those especially photojournalists covering the later half of the Vietnam War.

The F2 is the second member of the long line of Nikon F-series professional-level 35 mm SLRs that began with the Nikon F (manufactured 1959–1974) and followed each other in a sort of dynastic succession as the top-of-the-line Nikon camera. The other members were the F3 (1980–2001), F4 (1988–1996), F5 (1996–2005), and F6 (2004–2020). The F-series do not share any major components except for the all-important bayonet lens mount, the Nikon F-mount.

All Nikon professional F-series SLRs are full system cameras. This means that each camera body serves as only a modular hub.

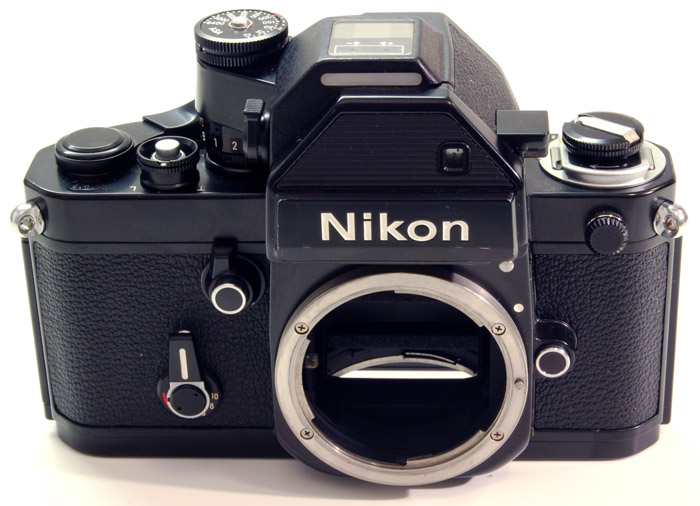
F2S

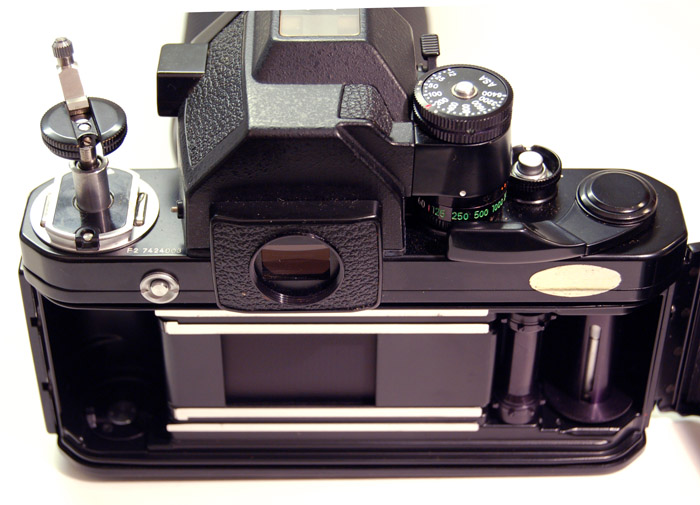
F2S, open film door

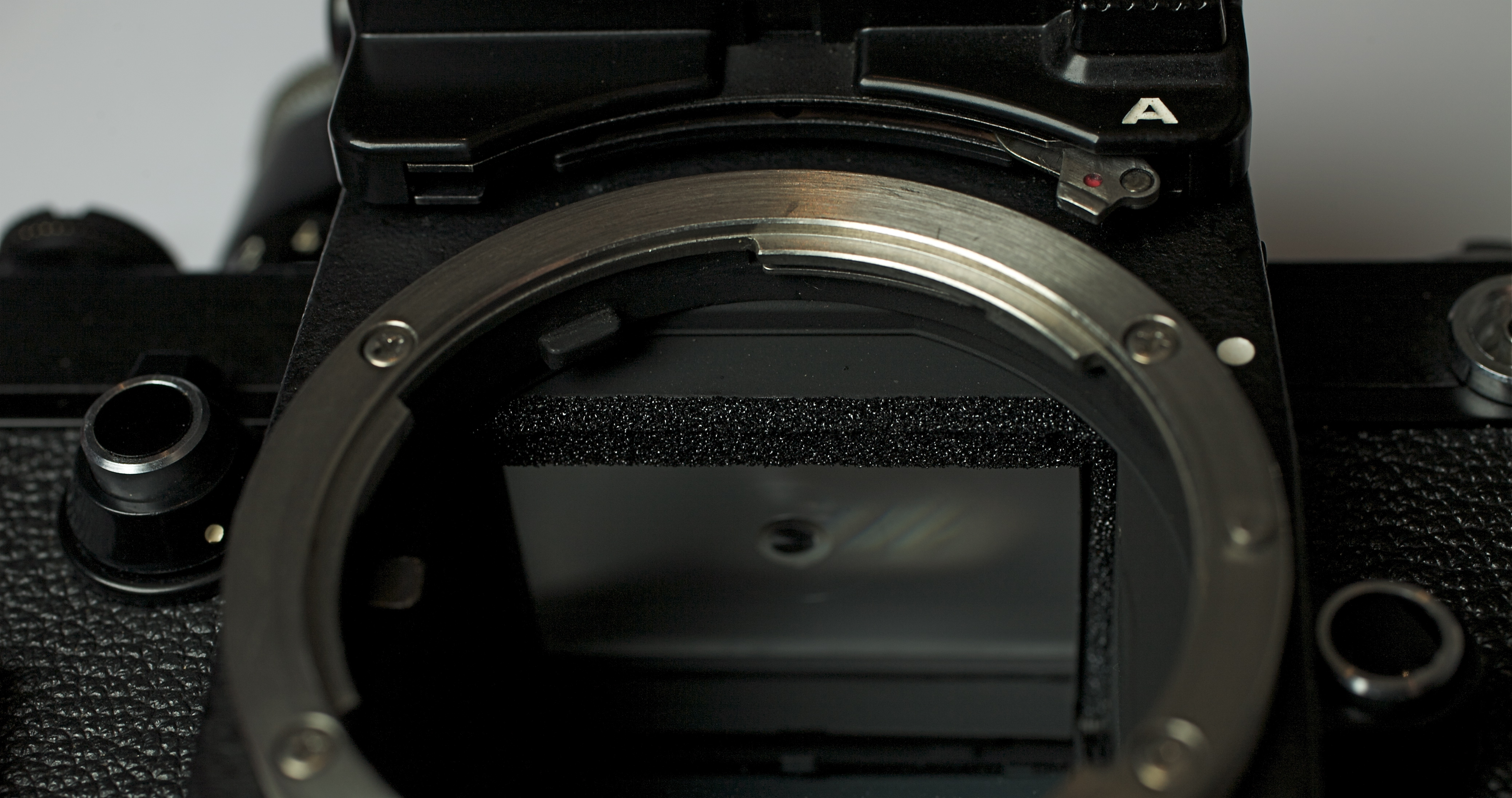
F2 – bayonet F-mount

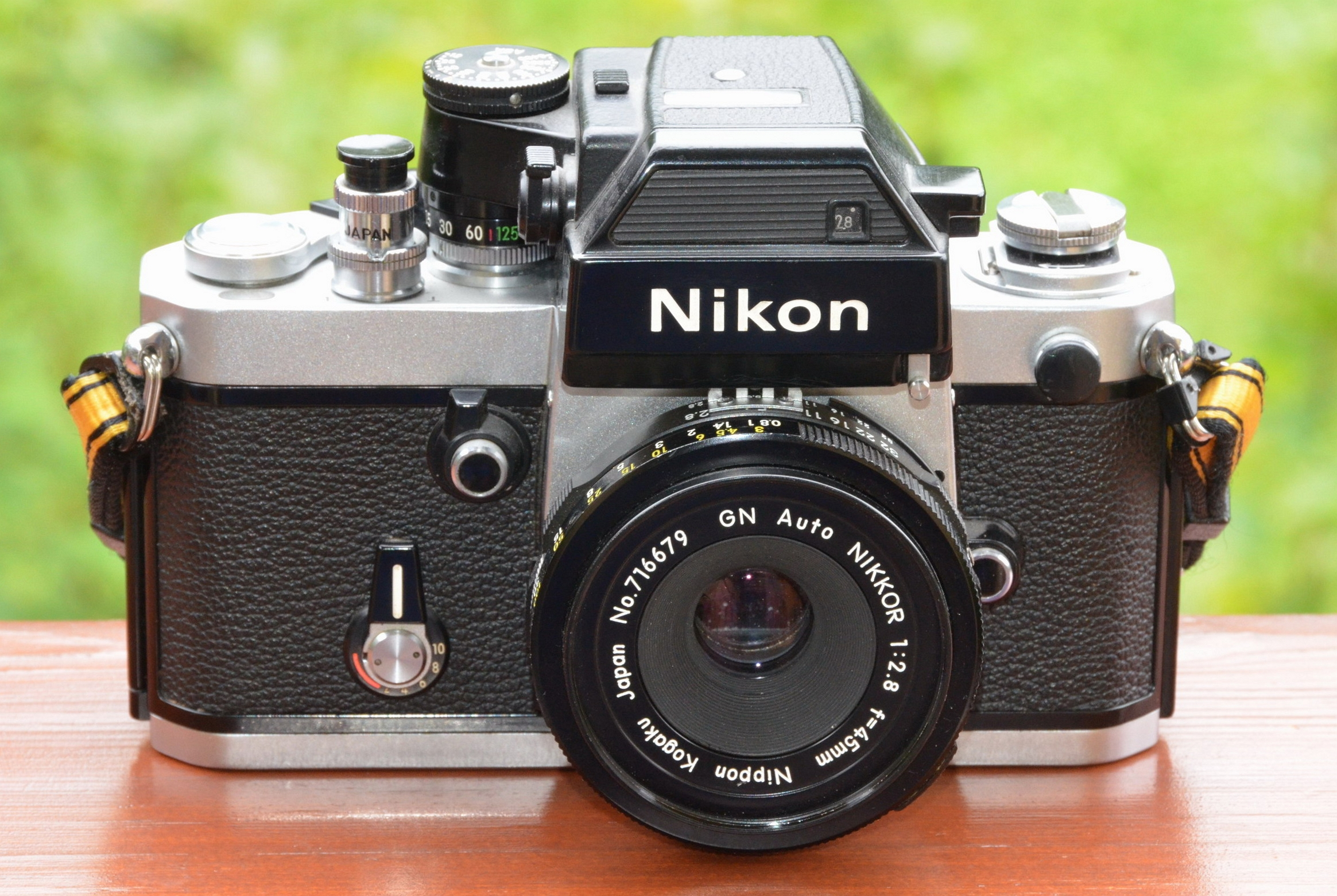
Nikon F2SB with DP-3 prism and GN Auto Nikkor 1:2,8 f=45mm lens

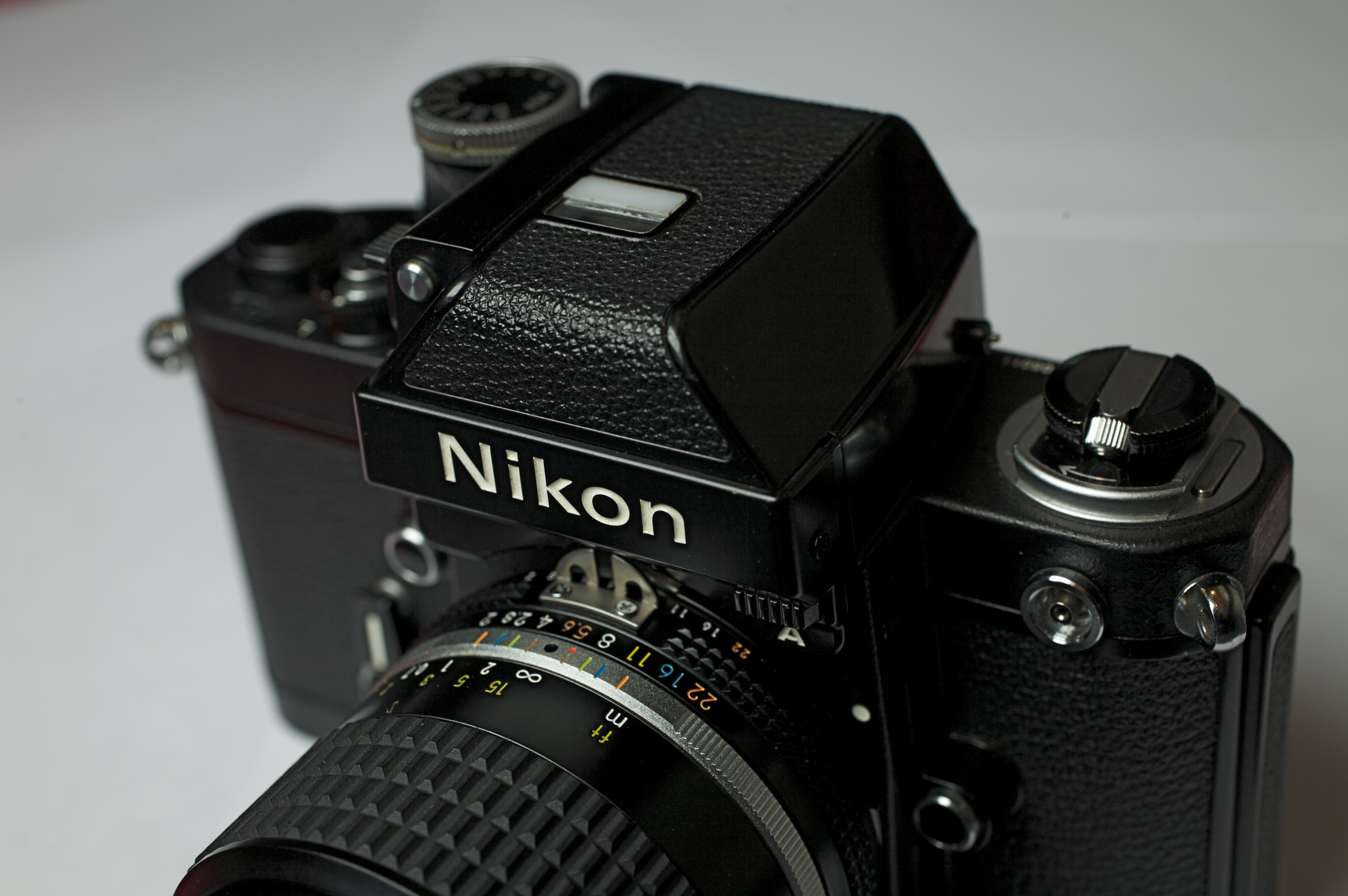
F2A – titanium body with DP-11 prism

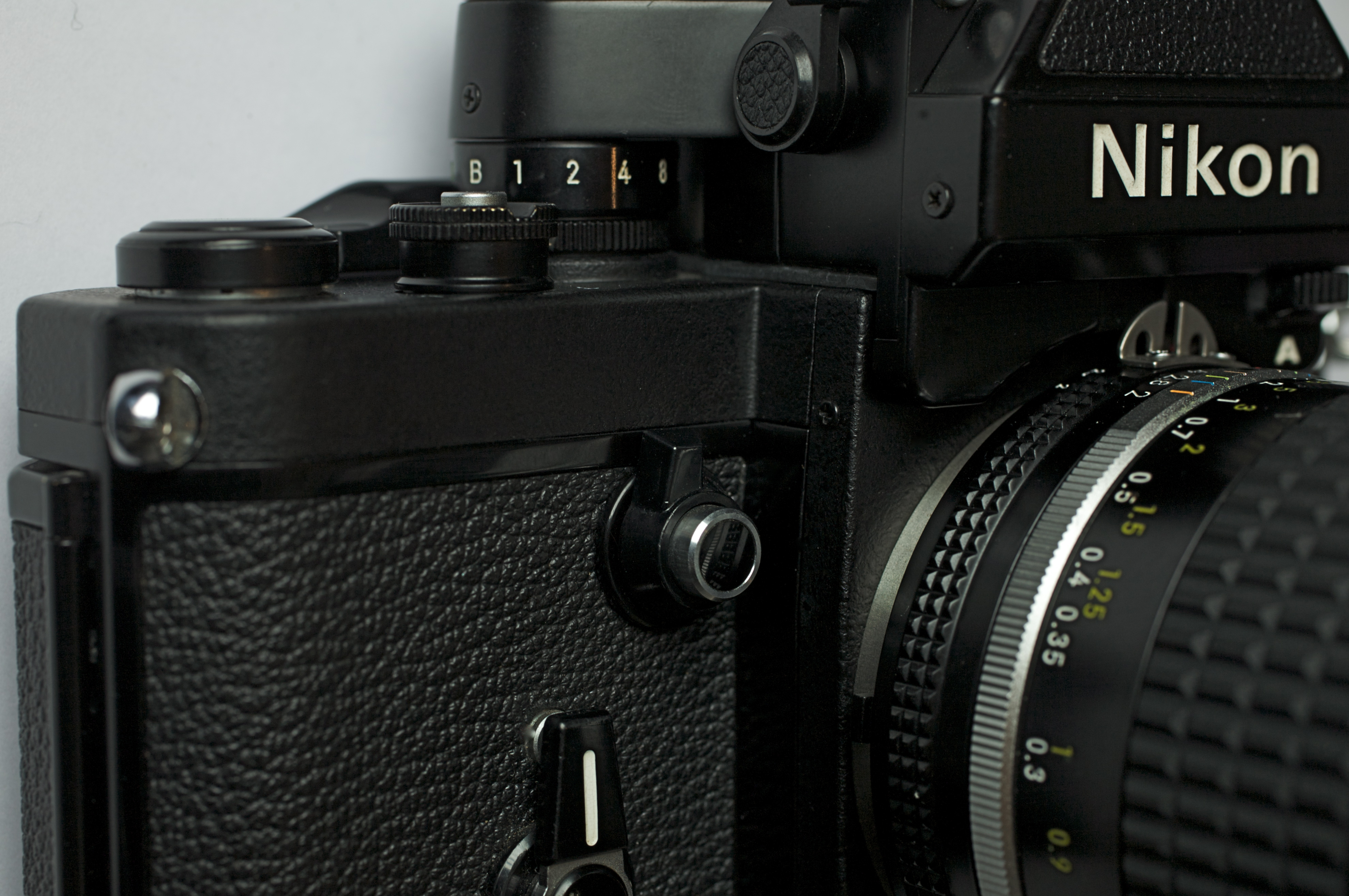
F2A – titanium body with DP-11 prism

== Features ==
The Nikon F2 is an all-metal, mechanically controlled (springs, gears, levers), manual focus SLR with manual exposure control. The camera itself needed no batteries, though the prism light meter did (and the motor drive if added). The F2 replaced the Nikon F, adding many new features (a faster 1/2000-second maximum shutter speed, a swing open back for easier film loading, a wider assortment of detachable finders and metering heads, a 250 exposure film back, a larger reflex mirror to ensure no vignetting, and a shutter release nearer the front of the camera for better ergonomics). It also offered a detachable motor drive, something the F only had as a custom modification. It was the last all-mechanical professional-level Nikon SLR.

== Lenses ==
The F2 accepts all lenses with the Nikon F bayonet mount (introduced in 1959 on the Nikon F camera), with certain limitations or exceptions depending on the F2 version. The later F2A and F2AS Photomic variants (see below) require lenses supporting the Automatic maximum aperture Indexing (AI) feature (introduced in 1977). The manual focus Nikon-made AI lenses were the Nikkor AI-S, Nikkor AI and Nikon Series E types. The AF-S Nikkor, AF-I Nikkor, AF Nikkor D and AF Nikkor autofocus lenses are also AI types. The original Nikkor "non-AI" (introduced before 1977) lenses, will mount but require stop down metering. Nikon had a service to retrofit non-AI lenses with a new aperture ring with the AI feature to produce "AI'd" lenses, but this service ended decades ago.

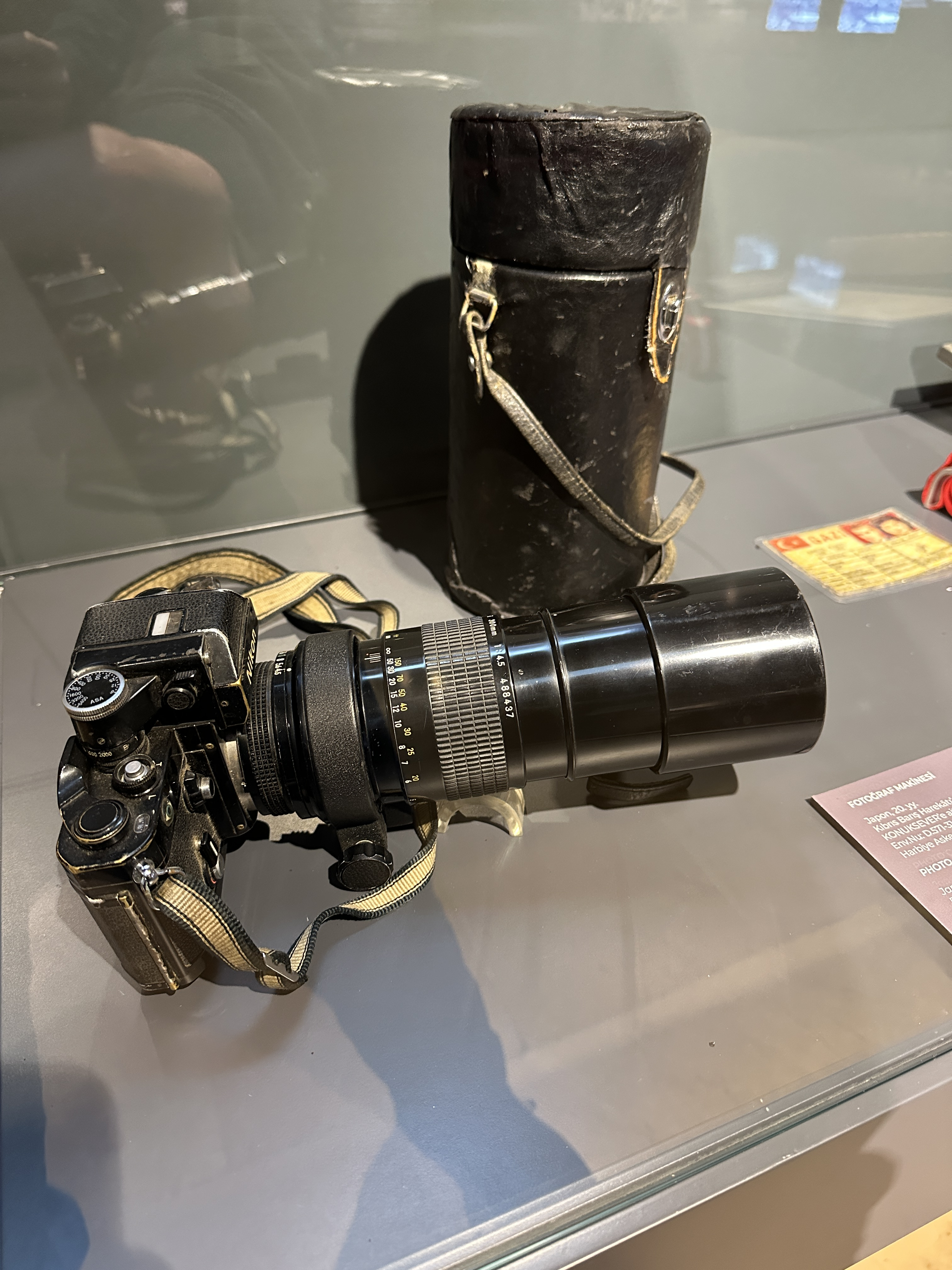
The Nikon F2 belonging to journalist Ergin Konuksever, who photographed the Turkish invasion of Cyprus, is exhibited at the Istanbul Harbiye Military Museum.

The older F2, F2S and F2SB Photomic variants (see below) require lenses with a "meter coupling shoe" (or prong, informally called "rabbit ears" by photography enthusiasts). These lenses are the Nikkor non-AI, AI'd Nikkor, Nikkor AI and Nikkor AI-S types. Lenses without rabbit ears, such as the Nikon Series E, AF Nikkor, AF Nikkor D, AF-I Nikkor and AF-S Nikkor types, will mount but require stop down metering.

The F2 with plain/eye-level DE-1 prism (no light meter; see below) will work with either lens types. Note that the Nikkor AI-S and Nikkor AI types are AI types plus have rabbit ears and will function properly on all Nikon F2 variants.

Nikon's most recent 35mm film SLR lenses, the AF Nikkor G type (2000) lacking an aperture control ring; and the AF Nikkor DX type (2003) with image circles sized for Nikon's DX digital SLRs, will mount but will not function properly. A few exotic fisheye lenses from the 1960s require mirror lock-up and therefore an auxiliary viewfinder is preferred. IX Nikkor lenses (1996), for Nikon's Advanced Photo System (APS) film SLRs, must not be mounted on any F2, as their rear elements will intrude far enough into the mirror box to cause damage even with the mirror locked up.

In 1977 Nikon made about 55 non-AI and AI lenses, ranging from a Fisheye-Nikkor 6 mm f/2.8 220° circular fisheye to a Reflex-Nikkor 2000 mm f/11 super-long mirror telephoto. This was the largest lens selection in the world by far.

The standard lens for most professionals was the Nikkor 50 mm f/1.4, but some preferred the Nikkor 35 mm f/2 with a wider field of view for grab shots. The Nikkor 105 mm f/2.5 was renowned for its superb sharpness and bokeh and was a favorite for head-and-shoulders portraits ("head shots").

Some special purpose lenses include:

- Micro-Nikkors 55 mm f/3.5 and 55 mm f/2.8, Micro-Nikkor 105 mm f/4 for close-up "macro" photography,
- Noct-Nikkor 58 mm f/1.2 for low light photography,
- PC-Nikkor 28 mm f/3.5 shifting perspective control lens,
- GN-Nikkor 45 mm f/2.8 for automatically setting the proper aperture for flash exposure based on distance and the guide number of the flash used (also useful as a very small/light "pancake" lens)
- Nikkor 13mm f/5.6 widest angle (118°) rectilinear lens
- Nikkor 300 mm f/2.8 ED IF fast telephoto
- Zoom-Nikkor 50–300 mm f/4.5 ED and the Zoom-Nikkor 43–86 mm f/3.5.

Independent manufacturer lenses were also available in the Nikon F mount. One example is the Vivitar Series 1 70–210 mm f/3.5 Macro Zoom (released 1974).

== Viewfinders ==
The F2's interchangeable viewfinders (also known as "heads") marked it as a professional-level SLR and was considered by consumers one of its biggest strengths. By providing updated heads every few years, Nikon was able to introduce new versions of the F2 and keep the basic body in the latest technology until production ended in 1980. Note that F2 heads were often sold separately from the body, mostly in black finish with about 10% in chrome, and it is therefore not unusual to see body/head combinations with mismatched serial numbers and/or colors.

The head on the basic Nikon F2 was called the Nikon DE-1. It provided a virtually 100% accurate viewing image, but was a plain pentaprism eyelevel viewing head with no built-in light meter and so had no metering or exposure information display, except for a flash-ready light. Unlike the other heads, about 90% of DE-1s were chrome finished. It was unpopular because of the lack of a built-in meter, but remained available for the life of the F2. F2 bodies with DE-1 finders maintain the highest prices on the secondary market.

If a pentaprism head with a built-in light meter was mounted on the F2, the camera became an F2 Photomic. However, since Nikon made five different metering heads over the life of the F2, there were five different F2 Photomic versions. The use of any Photomic head requires that batteries (two S76 or A76, or SR44 or LR44) be installed in the F2 body to power the head's electronics.

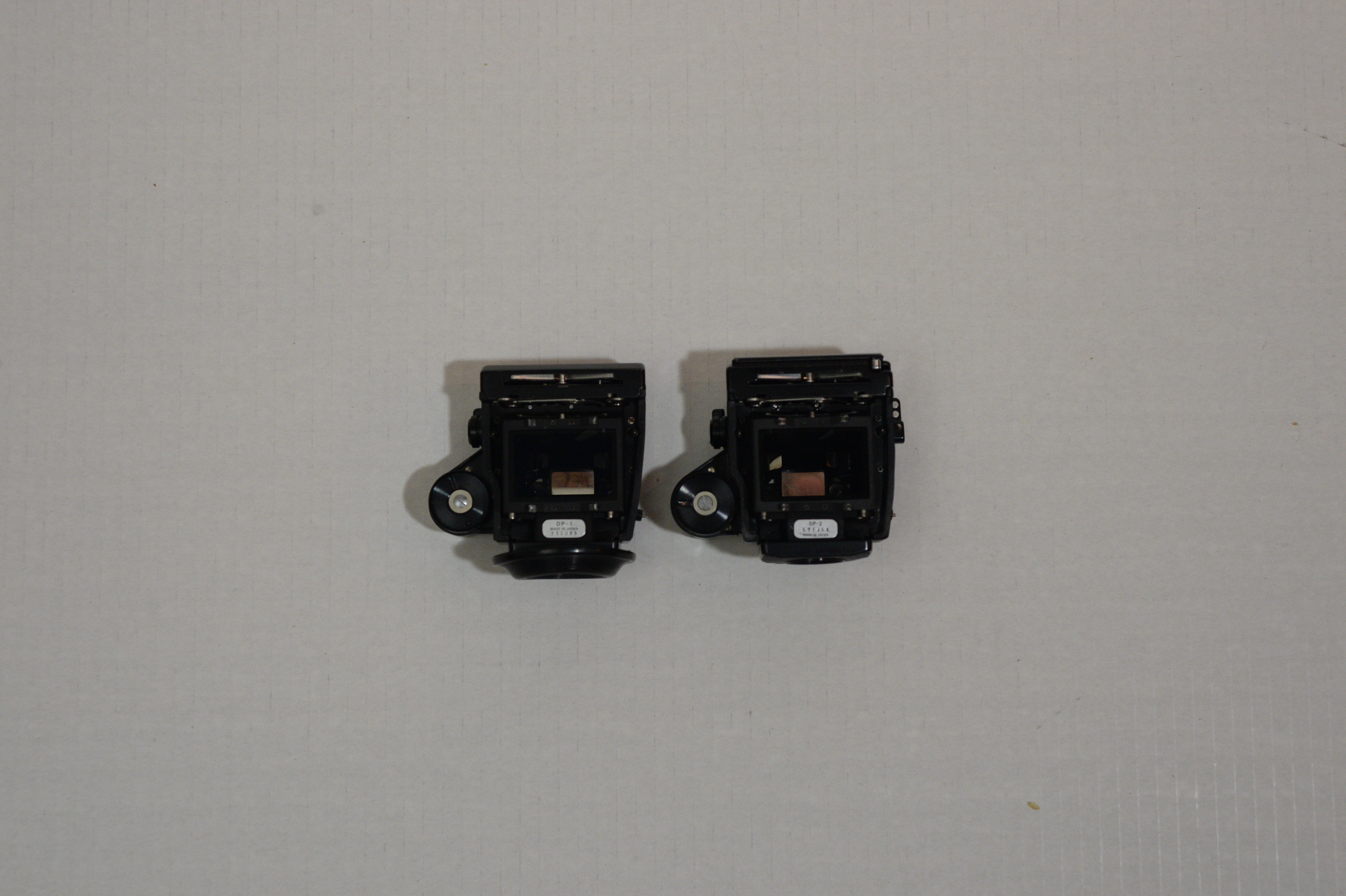
Nikon DP-1 and DP-2 viewfinders

The original Nikon F2 Photomic, packaged with the Nikon DP-1 head, was manufactured from 1971 to 1977. The DP-1 had a center-the-needle exposure control system using a galvanometer needle pointer moving between horizontally arranged +/– over/underexposure markers at the bottom of the viewfinder to indicate the readings of the built-in 60/40 percent centerweighted, cadmium sulfide (CdS) light meter versus the photographer's actual camera selections. Flanking the needle array on the left and right were a readout of the camera set f-stop and shutter speed, respectively. The needle array was duplicated on the top of the DP-1 head to allow exposure control without looking through the viewfinder. A Nikon F2 Photomic with Nikkor-S 50 mm f/1.4 lens had a US list price of $660 in 1972.

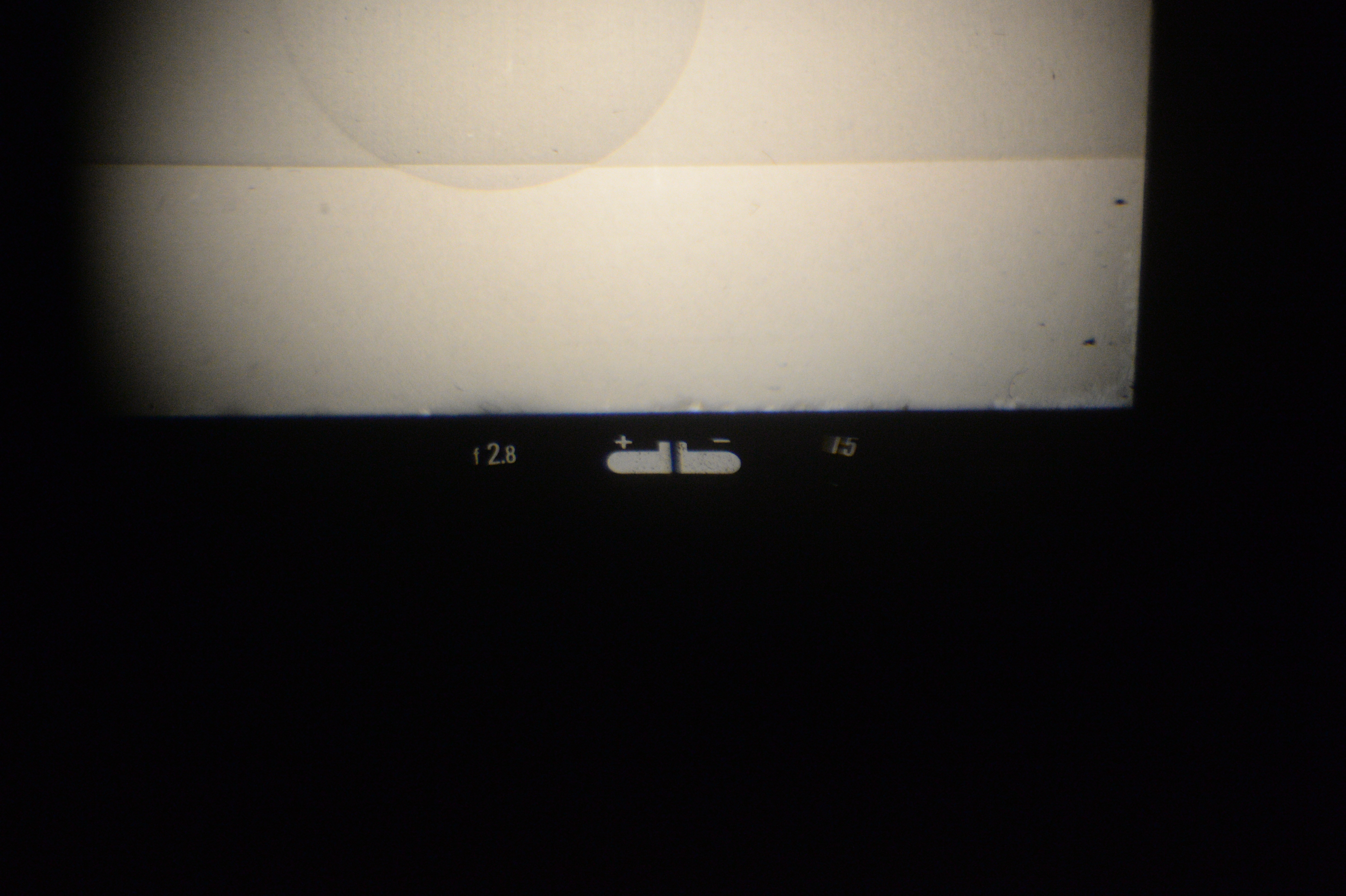
Needle lightmeter on DP-1

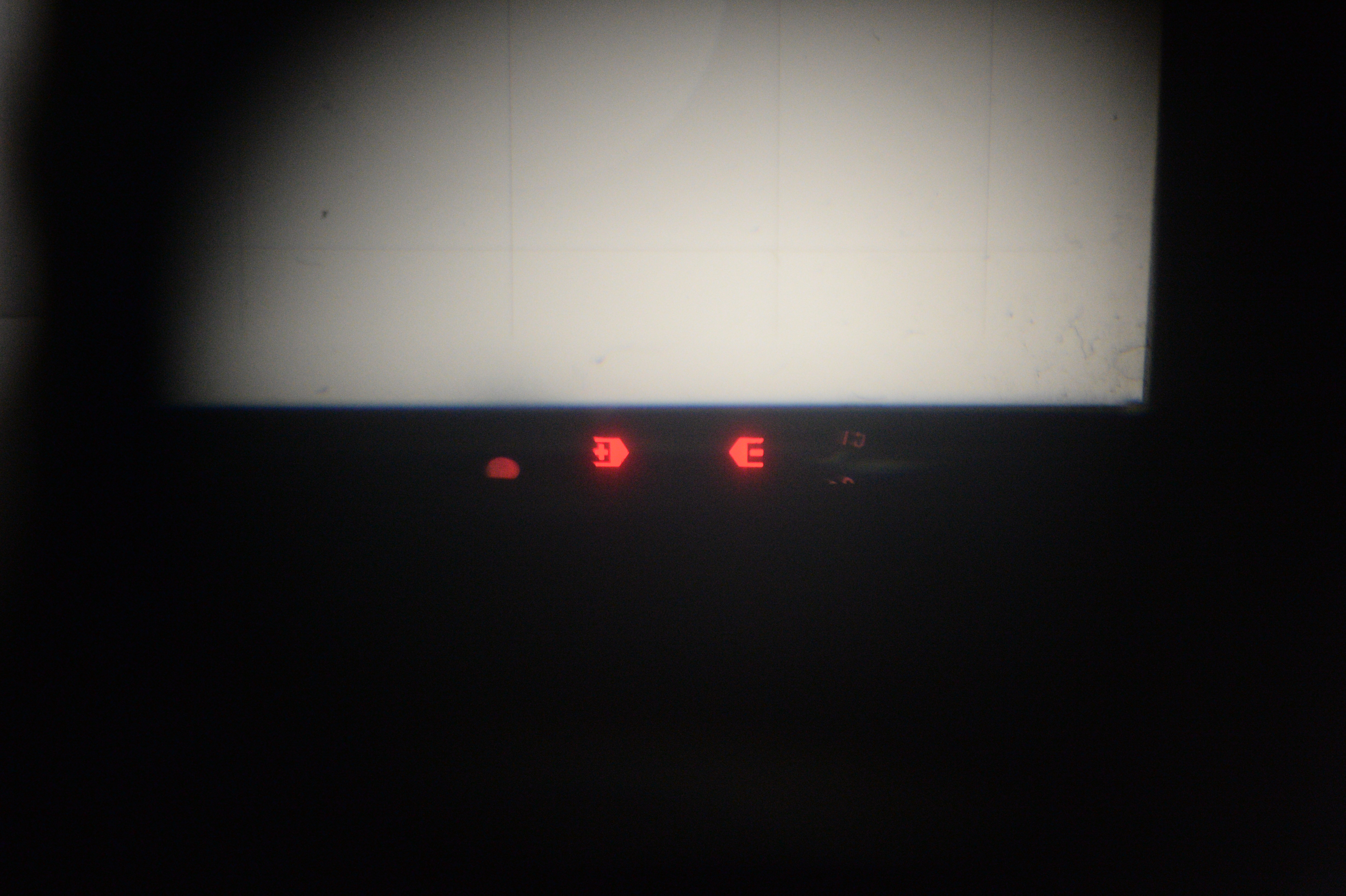
LED lightmeter on DP-2

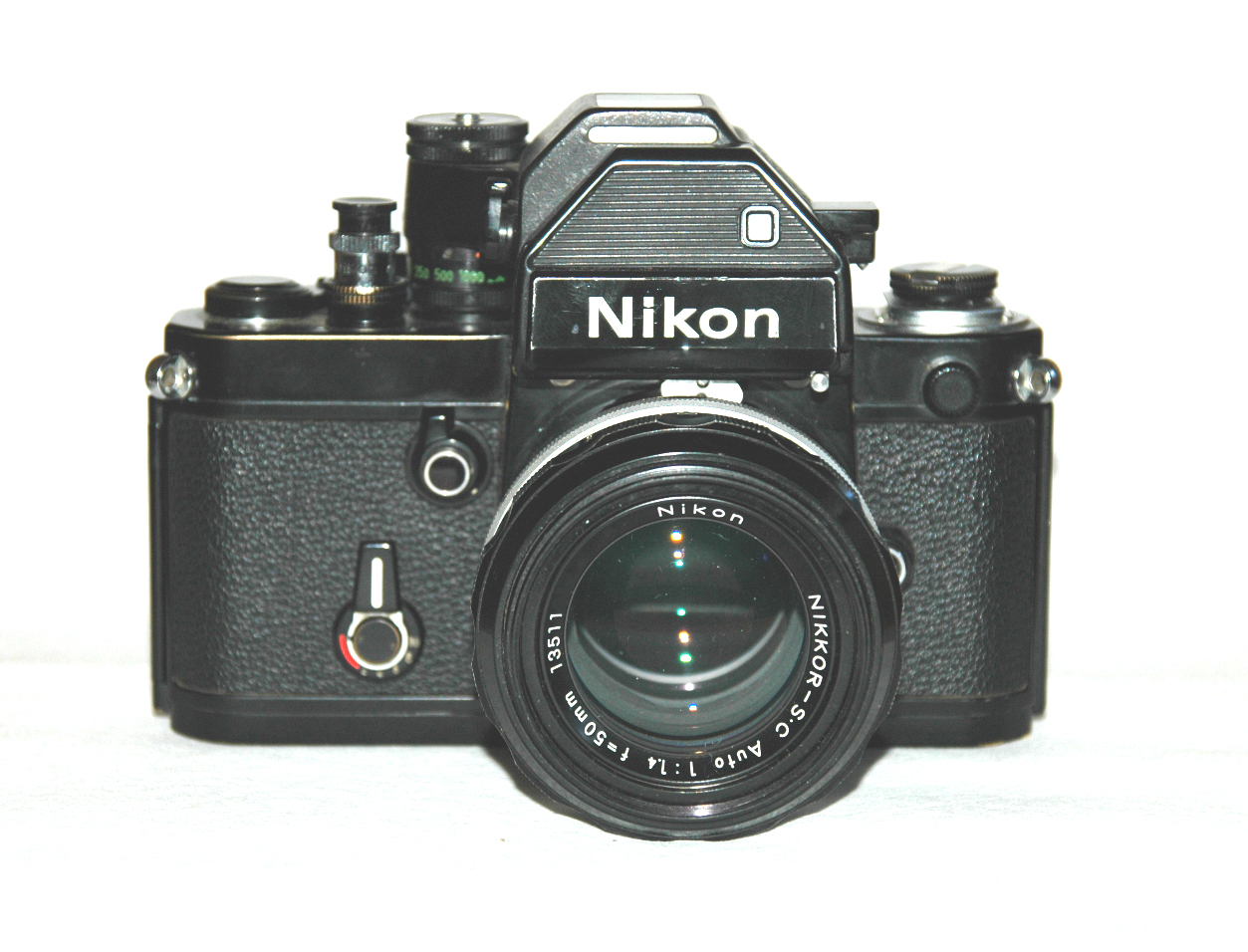
Nikon F2s using the DP-2 viewfinder

Manufactured from 1973 to 1977, the F2S Photomic used the DP-2 head. Although it looked very different, the DP-2 was functionally very similar to the DP-1. It substituted an all-solid-state light-both-LEDs exposure control system using two arrow-shaped light-emitting diode (LED) over/underexposure indicators for better visibility in low light situations and better overall reliability. This was important, because the DP-2's CdS meter had better low-light sensitivity than the DP-1—down to Exposure Value (EV) −2, instead of EV 1, at ASA 100. A chrome Nikon F2S Photomic with Nikkor 50 mm f/1.4 lens had a US list price of $961 in 1976. Note: SLRs were usually discounted 30 to 40 percent from list.

With the DP-3 head, the camera became the F2SB Photomic, available 1976 to 1977. The DP-3 introduced three innovations: a silicon photodiode light meter (a first for Nikon SLRs) for faster and more accurate light readings, a five-stage center-the-LED exposure control system using +/o/− LEDs, and an eyepiece blind.

These three early Photomic heads required Nikon F-mount lenses with a meter coupling shoe ("rabbit ears", see above). Rabbit ear lenses required a special mounting procedure. After mounting, the lens aperture ring must be turned back and forth to the smallest aperture (largest f-stop number) and then to the largest aperture (smallest f-stop number) to ensure that the lens and the head couple properly (Nikon called it indexing the maximum aperture of the lens—users called it the Nikon Shuffle) and meter correctly. This system seems unwieldy to today's photographers, but it was second nature to Nikon and Nikkormat camera using photographers of the 1960s and 1970s.

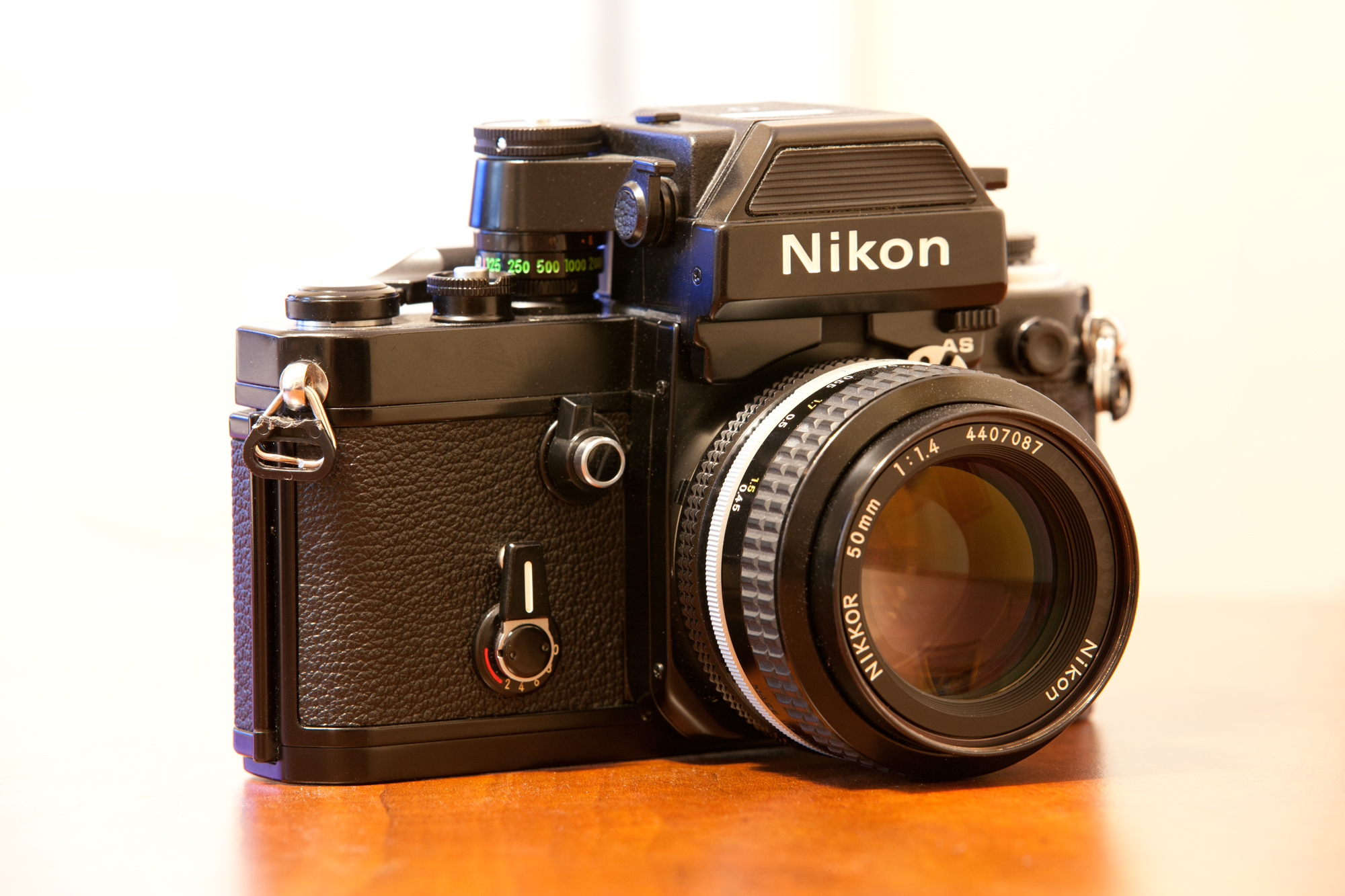
A black body F2AS (incl DP-12 prism, as seen here) was very popular among photojournalists in the 1970s.

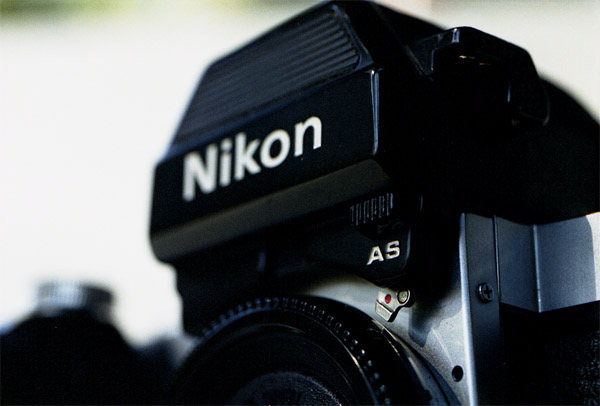
An F2AS (incl DP-12 prism). The EV metering range is a remarkable -2 to 17 with 100 ASA film.

The F2A Photomic came with the DP-11 head; the F2AS Photomic used the DP-12 head. The DP-11 and DP-12 (both introduced in 1977) functioned exactly the same as the DP-1 and DP-3, respectively, except that these heads supported Nikkor lenses with the Automatic Indexing (AI) feature (introduced 1977, see above). Nikkor AI lenses had a "meter coupling ridge" cam on the lens aperture ring that pushed on a spring-loaded "meter coupling lever" on the Photomic head to transfer aperture setting information. AI lenses enabled lenses to be mounted without having to align the lens with the camera body's "rabbit ears". The F2AS Photomic (DP-12 head) was the most advanced F2 version and the chrome version with Nikkor AI 50 mm f/1.4 lens had a US list price of $1,278 in 1978. (SLR selling prices were typically 30 to 40 percent below list.)

The F2S Photomic (DP-2 head) and F2SB Photomic (DP-3 head) also accepted the unusual Nikon DS-1 or DS-2 EE Aperture Control Units. The F2AS (DP-12) required the equivalent DS-12. These were early attempts by Nikon to provide shutter priority autoexposure by having an electric servomotor automatically turn the lens aperture ring in response to the set shutter speed and light meter reading. The DS-1, -2 and -12 were bulky, slow and unreliable, and were feeble and inelegant attempts to add autoexposure to the manual exposure F2.

There were also three special purpose meterless heads available for the F2: the Nikon DW-1 waist-level finder (a non-pentaprism head; look down directly at the mirror-reversed image on the focusing screen), the DA-1 action finder (providing 60 mm of eye relief; extremely large exit pupil that can be viewed while wearing face masks, safety goggles, etc.) and the DW-2 6X magnifying finder (waist-level finder with magnifier; good for precise focusing).

== Focusing screens ==
The F2 also had interchangeable viewfinder focusing screens. Nikon's standard Type K screen had central 3 mm split image rangefinder and 1 mm microprism collar focusing aids on a matte/Fresnel background plus a 12 mm etched circle indicating the area of the meter centerweighting. There were 18 other screens available with a variety of focusing aids or etched guidelines choices, including none at all. Note that the screens for the F2 were interchangeable with the ones for the Nikon F, but not with later F-series SLRs. The combination and wide selection of heads and screens allowed photographers to customize their F2s to their heart's content.

Nikon focusing screen types
Type	Image	Field	Center focusing aid	Notes
A		Ground matte Fresnel	Horizontal split-image rangefinder, 3 mm diameter	12 mm circle reference for center-weighted meter; compare with Types K, L. Standard equipment with early F2s. Changeover to Type K occurred circa 1976.
B		Ground matte Fresnel	Fine-ground matte, 3 mm diameter	12 mm circle reference for center-weighted meter; similar to Type A but omitting split-image; also compare with Type J. Useful for close ups and long telephotos.
C		Fine-ground matte, plain	Clear, 4 mm diameter + cross hair	Uses parallax focusing. Very bright and useful for photo-microscopy and astrophotography.
D		Fine-ground matte, plain	—	Best screen for use with long telephotos with small apertures.
E		Ground matte Fresnel	Fine-ground matte, 12 mm diameter	Etched grid lines, compare with Type R. Called "architectural screen" and excellent for "Rule of Thirds" pictorialist compositions. The most popular replacement screen.
G1 / G2 / G3 / G4		Clear Fresnel	Microprism, 12 mm diameter; Fresnel-free center spot	Extra-bright microprism without matte background (cannot assess depth of field). Four versions for use with specific focal length lenses. Not popular because switching lenses might necessitate switching the screen too.
H1 / H2 / H3 / H4		Clear Fresnel	Microprism, overall; Fresnel-free center spot	Also cannot assess depth of field. Four versions for use with specific focal length lenses. Intended for sports photography, but not popular because switching lenses might necessitate switching the screen too.
J		Ground matte Fresnel	Microprism, 4 mm diameter	12 mm circle reference for center-weighted meter
K		Ground matte Fresnel	Horizontal split-image rangefinder, 3 mm diameter + microprism collar, 1 mm thick	12 mm circle reference for center-weighted meter; combination of Types A and J
L		Ground matte Fresnel	Diagonal split-image rangefinder, 3 mm diameter	12 mm circle reference for center-weighted meter; compare with Types A, P. Permits focusing on horizontal or vertical subjects.
M		Ground matte Fresnel	Clear, 5.5 mm diameter + double cross-hair	Vertical and horizontal scales ruled at 1 mm. Excellent for photo-microscopy.
P		Ground matte Fresnel	Diagonal split-image rangefinder, 3 mm diameter + microprism collar, 1 mm thick	12 mm circle reference for center-weighted meter, etched horizontal and vertical lines; compare with Types K, L. Originally marketed as the "Apollo P screen," it was a screen favored by NASA on the bodies they acquired for their use.
R		Ground matte Fresnel	Horizontal split-image rangefinder, 3 mm diameter	Etched grid lines, compare with Type E; prisms at shallower angle than Type A, intended for slower lenses (maximum aperture > f/2.8).
S		Ground matte Fresnel	Horizontal split-image rangefinder, 3 mm diameter	Intended for use with MF-10/-11 data backs, includes rectangular area at left side of frame masked by memo plate; compare with Type A
T (TV)		Ground matte Fresnel	Horizontal split-image rangefinder, 3 mm diameter	12 mm circle reference for center-weighted meter, etched lines for broadcast television aspect ratio (4:3)

Selection of G1/G2/G3/G4 and H1/H2/H3/H4 should be determined by the specific lens being used, but the following general observations can be made:

- G1 / H1: Use with focal lengths ≤ 50 mm for slower lenses (maximum aperture ≥ f/2)
- G2 / H2: Use with focal lengths ≤ 200 mm
- G3 / H3: Use with focal lengths ≥ 180 mm
- G4 / H4: Use with focal lengths ≥ 600 mm

== Accessories ==
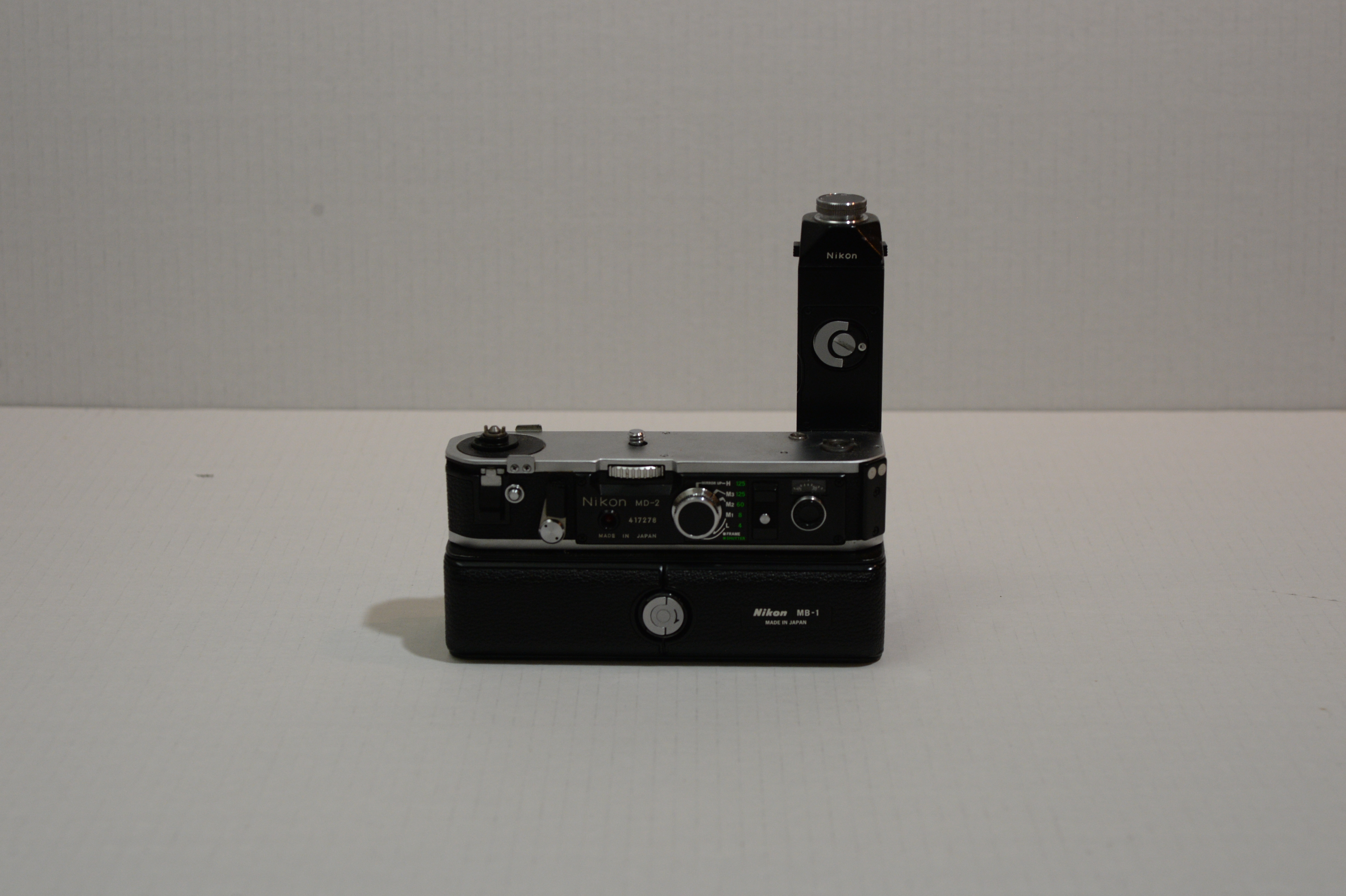
Nikon MD-2 motor drive back without camera

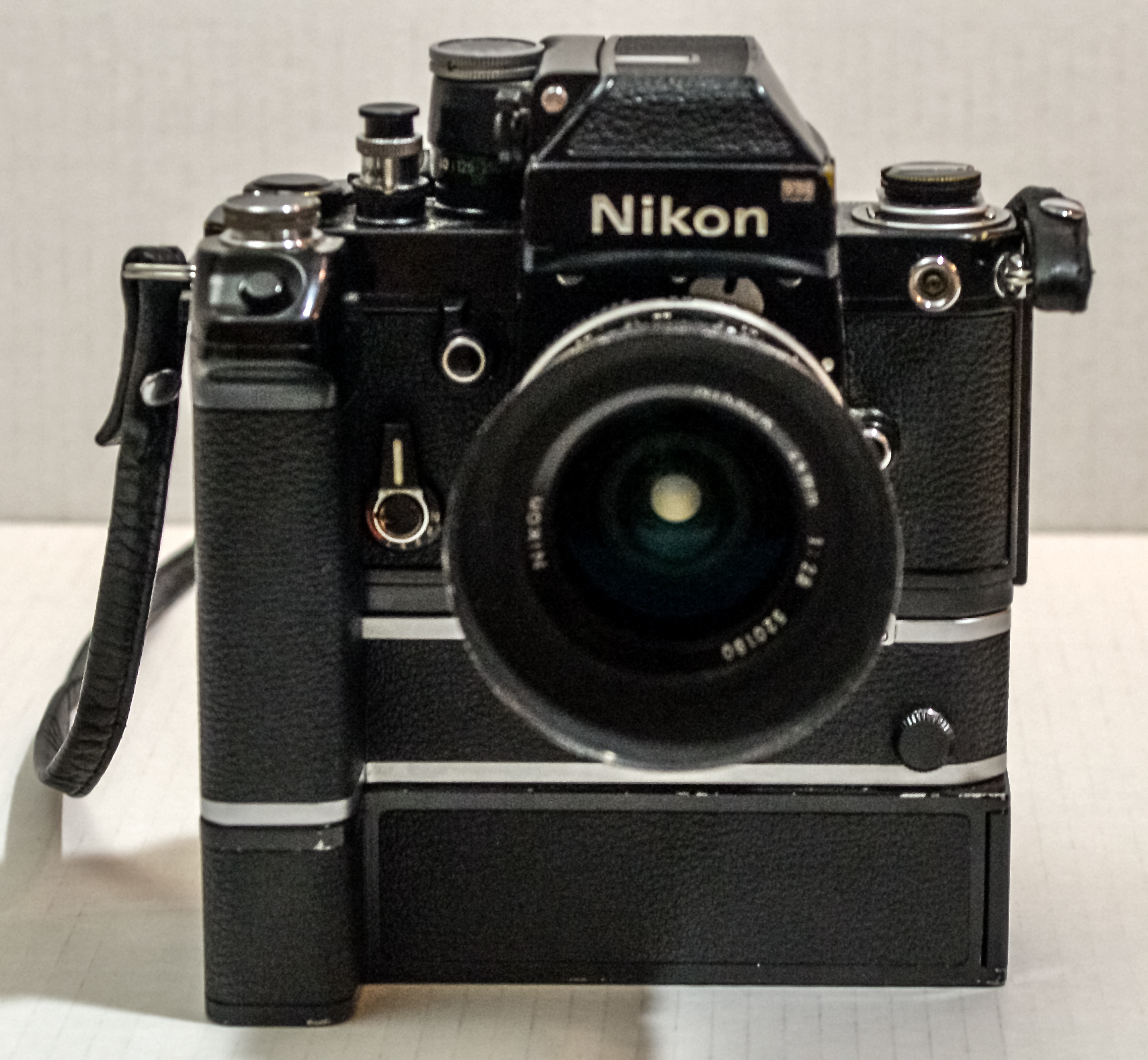
MD-2 motor drive front with camera

Major accessories for the F2 included the Nikon MD-1 (introduced in 1971) and MD-2 (1973) motor drives, providing automatic film advance up to 5 frames per second, 6 if the mirror was locked up, plus power rewind. They both required a Nikon MB-1 battery pack holding 10 AA or LR6 batteries in two Nikon MS-1 battery clips. Note that the 5 frame/s rate required that the F2 have its mirror locked up and the MD-1 or -2 be loaded with two Nikon MN-1 nickel-cadmium rechargeable batteries. (These batteries are long since dead.) With the mirror operating, the maximum advance rate is 4.3 frame/s; with AAs, the rate is 4 frame/s. The addition of the MD-1 or MD-2 greatly increased the overall weight of the camera. With a fully loaded MD-2/MB-1 and 50mm lens, the F2 would weigh in at just over six pounds.

The F2 also accepted the lighter, cheaper and less capable Nikon MD-3 motor drive. The MD-3 did not have power rewind and had an advance rate of 2.5 frame/s with the standard MB-2 battery pack holding 8 AA or LR6 batteries. Optionally, it could reach 3.5 frame/s with an MB-1 battery pack with 10 AA or LR6 batteries; 4 frame/s with MB-1 and MN-1 nicad battery.

The F2 could also mount the Nikon MF-1 (33/10 feet/meters film = 250 frames; required two Nikon MZ-1 film cassettes) and MF-2 (100/30 feet/meters film = 750 frames; required two MZ-2 film cassettes) bulk film backs. These were very useful if a photographer had a motor drive mounted and needed to take more than seven seconds' worth of photographs. Note that the MF-2 and its MZ-2 cassettes are very rare.

Starting in 1976, Nikon introduced the Nikon Speedlight SB-2 (guide number 82/25 (feet/meters) at ASA 100), SB-5 (guide number 105/32 (feet/meters) at ASA 100), SB-6 (guide number 148/45 (feet/meters) at ASA 100) and SB-7E (guide number 82/25 (feet/meters) at ASA 100) electronic flashes. Note that the F2 did not use a standard ISO hot shoe to mount flash units. Instead, the SB-2, -6 and -7E mounted in a unique-to-Nikon-F-and-F2 hot shoe surrounding the film rewind crank. Manually rewinding film could not be done with a flash mounted in this shoe because the flash blocked the crank. Standard ISO foot flashes can be connected to the Nikon shoe via the Nikon AS-1 Flash Unit Coupler.

The Nikon ML-1 Modulite was a wireless infrared remote controller with a 200/60 feet/meters line-of-sight range. It was a two part device: a handheld transmitter plus a camera mounted receiver. Note that the receiver needed to be connected to a motor drive. The Nikon MW-1 was a similar device, but was larger and more powerful and used radio signals for a longer 2300/700 feet/meters obstructed view range. The MW-1 could also control three separate F2s by broadcasting three different codes.

The Nikon MT-1 intervalometer allowed completely untended time lapse photography. It could fire the F2 for a specific number of frames at a particular shutter speed at set time intervals.

Nippon Kogaku also made scores of minor accessories for the F2, such as straps, cases, bags, remote firing cords, eyecups, eyepiece correction lenses, supplementary close-up lenses, lens hoods, filters and cases. In 1978 the complete Nikon photographic system of cameras, lenses and accessories totaled nearly 450 items priced in excess of US$110,000—the most extensive and expensive in the world.

== Special F2 Versions ==
There were several special purpose versions of the F2 manufactured in small numbers. They are considered rare collector's items.

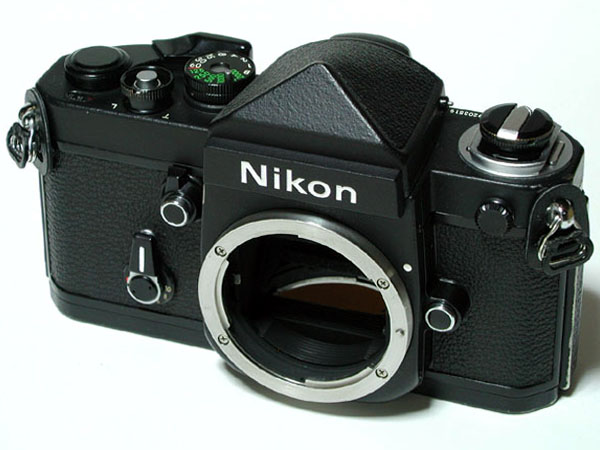
F2 T

The F2T was a special ultra-rugged version of the F2 (DE-1 head) with titanium bayonet mount, top and bottom plates, and camera back, plus a special DE-1T titanium covered meterless prism head, sold in parallel with the regular F2s from 1978 to 1980. Most F2Ts were given a special textured black finish but a very few came in natural titanium finish, including the first F2Ts and the very last F2s ever manufactured. Their serial numbers began with '92', e.g., "F2 9201544.'

The F2 Titan was a black only late variant of the F2T, distinguished by the word "Titan" engraved in Roman script on the front of the camera below the shutter release. They carry the number 79 in front of the serial number.

The H in the F2H of 1978 denoted "High Speed". It was yet another titanium-armored F2 but this time with a fixed (not reflex), semi-silvered, pellicle mirror, manual lens diaphragm control and a mechanically matched titanium-armored Nikon MD-100 high-speed motor drive. The maximum shutter speed is 1/1000 (vs. 1/2000 for other F2 models). The self-timer and shutter settings 'B' and 'T' were omitted. The depth-of-field preview button was replaced with a 'Full-Aperture Viewing Button'. The Nikon MD-100 motor drive was a modified version of the MD-2 motor drive and was powered by the Nikon MB-100. The MB-100 consists of two MB-1 battery packs (20 AA or LR6 batteries, or four Nikon MN-1 nickel-cadmium rechargeable batteries, providing 30 volts), weighing a massive 960 g empty and reaching 10 frames-per-second film advance rate. The F2H set included the Nikon MH-100 battery charger. All components (body, motor and batterypack) may be detached from each other. The bodies (7-digit serial number) and motordrives (6-digit serial number) do not have matching serial numbers, contrary to often repeated misinformation. Body serial numbers began with 7850001, e.g. 'F2 7850001'. Approximately 400 units were produced making the F2H extremely rare, the rarest of any 'production model' F2, and valuable.

As the name implies, the F2 Data had a primitive data back. It used a tiny internal flash unit to imprint the time, date or sequential number on the film. This data back recorded the time by imprinting a tiny picture of a slightly less tiny Seiko made analogue clock onto the film. It also had a special insert plate that the photographer could write on and have this note imprinted on the film. There were two versions of the F2 Data: one with the MF-10 camera back for standard 35 mm film cartridges and one with the MF-11 250 frame bulk film back. The F2 Data also came packaged with an MD-2 motor drive and your choice of DE-1, DP-11 or DP-12 head plus a special Type S focusing screen that marked the left-side data imprint area. F2 Data bodies carry the numbers '77' in front of the serial number. Approximately 5,000 units were produced.

Finally there was the F2A Anniversary model. This was marketed as a collector's item of 4,000 specially numbered bodies intended to commemorate the 25th anniversary of Nikon cameras in the USA. A plate was glued to the front of the camera below the shutter release noting, "25th Anniversary" (which has fallen off many bodies) and came in a special silver-colored box. The F2A Anniversary was not authorized by Nikon; it was the creation of the American importer, Ehrenreich Photo-Optical Industries (EPOI).

== Current status ==
Because of the F2's durability, and the large amount of units manufactured, (816,000 units) and because film SLRs have been largely replaced with digital equivalents in many markets, the F2 is still relatively common today and is available on the used market for low prices—US$200–400 depending on the head. However, these may be well worn examples used by professional photographers and are generally in mediocre condition.

The Nikon F2 is also collectable. If a pristine F2 body and head with date-compatible serial numbers is found, it will carry collector's items price tags. The black body version of the F2AS model, in near new condition, can exceed $1,100 at auction.

Class	1950s			1960s										1970s										1980s										1990s										2000s										2020s			
Class	57	58	59	60	61	62	63	64	65	66	67	68	69	70	71	72	73	74	75	76	77	78	79	80	81	82	83	84	85	86	87	88	89	90	91	92	93	94	95	96	97	98	99	00	01	02	03	04	05	06	07	08	09	...	20	21	22
Profes- sional			F																					F3																																	
Profes- sional															F2												F3AF					F4								F5								F6									
High- end																											FA					F-801 (N8008)/ F-801s (N8008s)				F90 (N90)		F90X (N90s)					F100														
Mid- range																														F-501 (N2020)				F-601 (N6006)				F70 (N70)						F80 (N80)													
Mid- range																EL / EL2 /ELW						FE					FE2							F-601M (N6000)				F70 (N70)						F80 (N80)													
Mid- range									FT		FTn/ FT2/ FT3										FM					FM2/FM2n																			FM3A												
Mid- range									FS												FM					FM2/FM2n																			FM3A												
Entry- level																																																									
Entry- level																																								Pronea 600i/6i																	
Entry- level																																										Pronea S															
Entry- level						Nikkorex F / Nikkor J																	EM			FG			F-301 (N2000)				F-401s (N4004s)					F50 (N50)							F65 (N65 / U)		F75 (N75 / U2)										
Entry- level				35		35 II		Auto 35																				FG-20			F-401 (N4004)				F-401x (N5005)								F60 (N60)			F55 (N55)											
Entry- level							Zoom 35																																FM10 / FE10																		
Class	57	58	59	60	61	62	63	64	65	66	67	68	69	70	71	72	73	74	75	76	77	78	79	80	81	82	83	84	85	86	87	88	89	90	91	92	93	94	95	96	97	98	99	00	01	02	03	04	05	06	07	08	09	...	20	21	22
Class	1950s			1960s										1970s										1980s										1990s										2000s										2020s			
