= Rectilinear lens =

Type of photographic lens

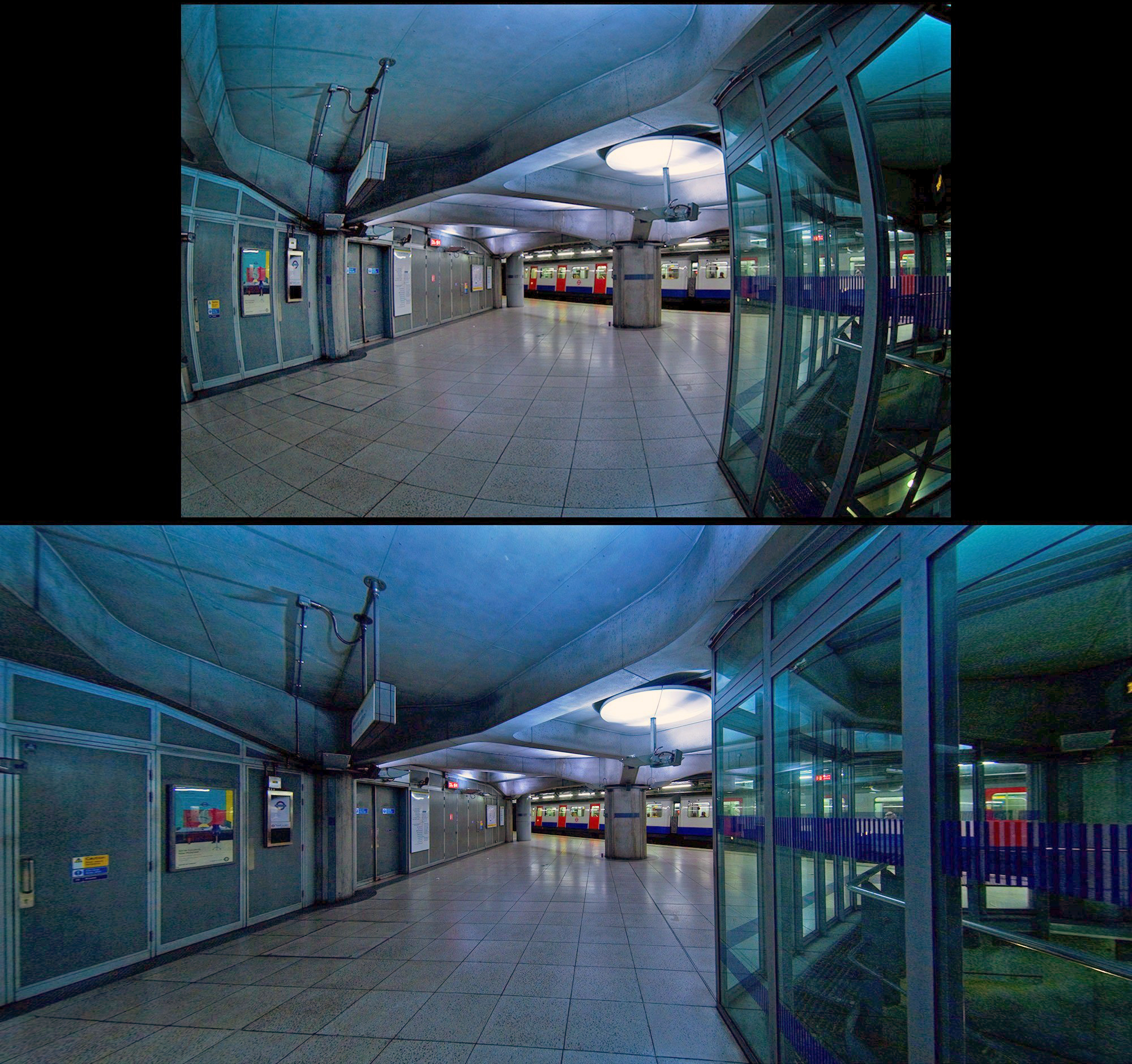
Curvilinear (above) and rectilinear (below) image. Notice the barrel distortion typical for fisheye lenses in the curvilinear image. While this example has been rectilinear-corrected by software, high quality wide-angle lenses are built with optical rectilinear correction.

In photography, a rectilinear lens is a photographic lens that yields images where straight features, such as the edges of walls of buildings, appear with straight lines, as opposed to being curved. In other words, it is a lens with little or no barrel or pincushion distortion. At particularly wide angles, however, the rectilinear perspective will cause objects to appear increasingly stretched and enlarged as they near the edge of the frame. These types of lenses are often used to create forced perspective effects.

The most famous example is the Rapid Rectilinear Lens developed by John Henry Dallmeyer in 1866. It allowed distortionless photos to be taken quickly for the first time, and was a standard lens design for 60 years. As of 2020, the Laowa 9mm f/5.6 lens is the world's widest rectilinear lens for full frame cameras.

The vast majority of video and still cameras use lenses that produce nearly rectilinear images. A popular alternative type of lens is a fisheye lens which produces a distinctly curvilinear, wide-angled result.

== See also ==
- Rectilinear grid
- Rectilinear projection
- Nikkor 13mm f/5.6
- Pinhole camera model
