= Nikkor 13mm f/5.6 =

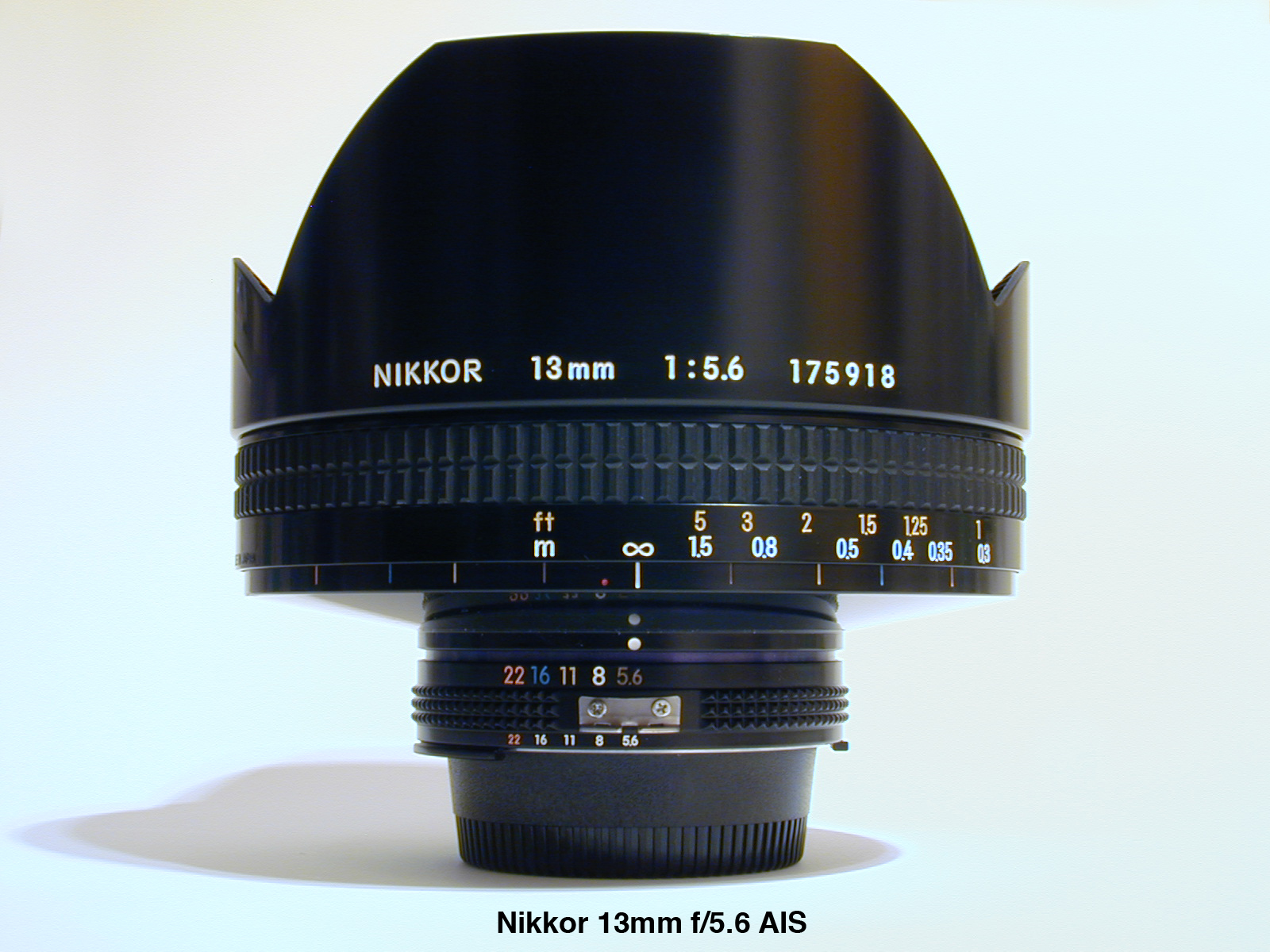
- Maker: Nikon
- Lens mount: F-mount

Technical data
- Focus drive: No No
- Focal length: 13.3mm
- Image format: FX (full-frame)
- Aperture (max/min): f/5.6 - f/22
- Close focus distance: 0.30 m (1.0 ft)
- Diaphragm blades: 7
- Construction: 16 elements in 12 groups

Features
- Lens-based stabilization: No No
- Macro capable: No No
- Aperture ring: Yes Yes
- Application: Ultra-wide angle prime

Physical
- Max. length: 100 mm (88.5 mm from flange)
- Diameter: 115 mm
- Weight: 1240 g (AI version)
- Filter diameter: rear bayonet type

Accessories
- Lens hood: Built in
- Case: CL-14

Angle of view
- Horizontal: 108°
- Vertical: 85°
- Diagonal: 118° (with 135 film format)

History
- Introduction: March 1976

Retail info
- MSRP: 8,229.00 (1979 price) USD

The Nikkor 13mm f/5.6 is an ultra-wide angle rectilinear lens which was manufactured by Nikon for use on Nikon F mount cameras until 1998. It has been dubbed 'The Holy Grail', for its low-distortion ultra-wide capabilities. The lens was produced by Nikon only upon receipt of an order, thus making it one of the Nikon lenses with the least number manufactured.

== Introduction ==
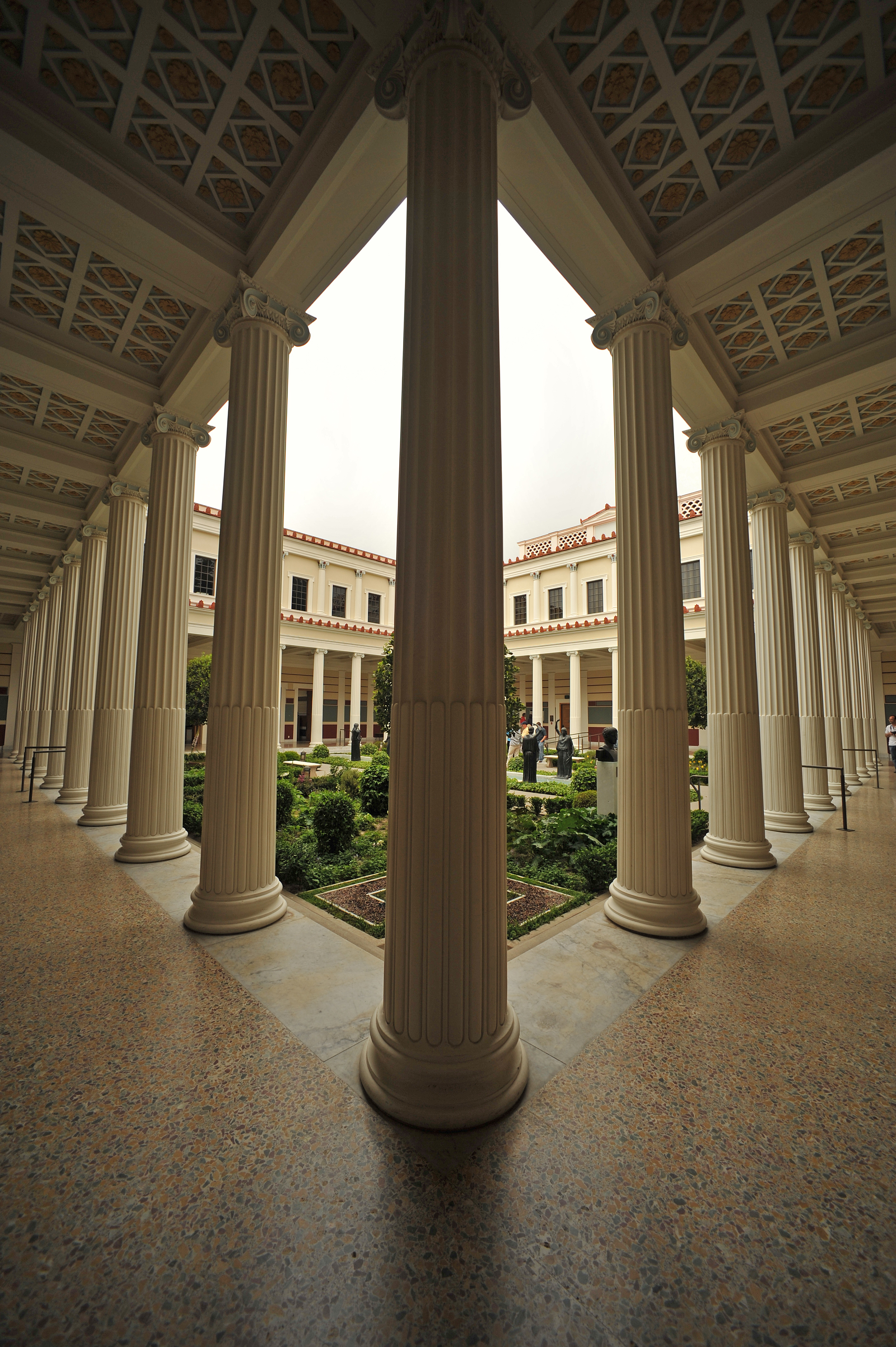
As a highly perfected rectilinear lens, straight lines are rendered perfectly straight (while a similar focal length Fish-Eye lens will distort such lines). This photograph was taken at the Getty Villa in Pacific Palisades, CA with the 13mm Nikkor.

The lens was prototyped in 1973 and released on an 'order only' basis from March 1976. It was designed by Mr. Ikuo Mori, First Optical Section, Optical Designing Department (now retired) and built in Japan.

== Features ==
- Very little distortion (less than typical 50 mm normal lenses) and lateral chromatic aberration.
- Close Range Optical Correction (CRC) system: floating lens elements are used to reduce aberrations at close focusing distances.

== Construction ==
- 16 lens elements in 12 groups.
- Extreme retrofocus optical design with backfocus of more than three times the focal length.
- Triplet/Tessar type master lens group behind the aperture.
- Wide-angle lens group in front of the aperture to reduce the image size.

== Versions ==
- Nikkor F 13mm f/5.6 - March 1976 (non-AI). Serial numbers began with: 175021.
- AI Nikkor 13mm f/5.6 - June 1977. Serial numbers began with 175055.
- AIS Nikkor 13mm f/5.6 - March 1982. Discontinued in 1998. Serial numbers began with 175901.

== See also ==
- The Zeiss 8R Ultra Prime T2.8 is a rectilinear wide angle motion picture lens with an even slightly wider field of view, even when considering its smaller sized image circle. It is intended as an alternative to the Nikkor 8mm f/2.8 fisheye, which has seen frequent film and video use.
- The Sigma 12–24mm f/4.5–5.6, introduced in 2003, a rectilinear ultra-wide zoom designed for the 35 mm format (both film and digital), providing a slightly wider field of view. The company replaced this lens in 2016 with a version offering the same focal length range but a constant maximum aperture of f/4.
- The Sigma 8–16mm, introduced in 2010, a rectilinear ultra-wide zoom designed for DSLRs with APS-C sensors, providing essentially the same 35mm equivalent field of view as the company's 12–24mm offering on full-frame.
- The Canon EF 11–24mm, introduced in 2015, a rectilinear ultra-wide zoom designed for the company's full-frame DSLRs.
